This is a list of foreign football players in the Yugoslav First League or any of its successor top leagues:
 Yugoslav First League (1923–1992), indicated in the list as (Yug/X), followed by the abbreviation of the current league of that club
 First Leagues of the Sub associations (1920–1944)
 First League of FR Yugoslavia (1992–2002), indicating (SRB) if the club is from present-day Serbia or (MNE) if from Montenegro
 First League of Serbia and Montenegro (2002–2006), indicating (SRB) if the club is from present-day Serbia or (MNE) if from Montenegro
 Serbian Superliga (2006–present), indicated as (SRB)
 Montenegrin First League (2006–present), indicated as (MNE)
 Kosovo Superliga (1999–present), indicated as (KOS)
 Slovenian PrvaLiga (1991–present), indicated as (SVN)
 Prva HNL – Croatian First League (1992–present), indicated as (CRO)
 1. MFL – Macedonian First League (1992–present), indicated as (MKD)
 First League of Herzeg-Bosnia (1993–2000)
 First League of Football Association of Bosnia and Herzegovina (1994–2000)
 First League of the Federation of Bosnia and Herzegovina (1994–2002)
 First League of the Republika Srpska (1995–2002)
 Premier League of Bosnia and Herzegovina (2000–present), indicated as (BIH)

In this list are also included the players with dual nationalities and the ones born in the territory of former Yugoslavia, but have played for other, non-Yugoslav, national team.

Players in bold have made at least one appearance for their senior national team.

Teams in bold are the current team of that player.

The years in brackets indicates the calendar year of the season in which the player played for the club. For example, "(2003)–2004" means that the player was a member of the club only in the first part of the season (2003).

Afghanistan
 Modjieb Jamali – (MNE) – Dečić Tuzi 2016–(2017)
 Seliman Yar – (KOS) – Trepça '89 2009–2011

Albania
Players in bold italics are the ones that besides Albania played for Kosovo national team as well.
 Kristal Abazaj – (CRO) – Osijek 2018–(2019)
 Edmond Abazi – (Yug/CRO) – Hajduk Split 1990–1993, Šibenik 1993–1994
 Arbër Abilaliaj – (CRO) – Inter Zaprešić 2010–2012
 Valon Ahmedi – (SVN, CRO, MKD) – Celje 2014–2015, Maribor 2015–2018, Inter Zaprešić (2019)–2020, Škendija Tetovo 2019–2021
 Berat Ahmeti – (KOS) – Prishtina 2013–2014, Gjilani 2016–2017, Feronikeli 2017–2019, (2021)–2022, Trepça '89 2019–2020, Drenica 2021–present
 Adrian Aliaj – (CRO) – Hajduk Split 1996–1998
 Isnik Alimi – (MKD, CRO) – Ohrid 2010–2012, Šibenik 2020–2021
 Fidan Aliti – (CRO) – Slaven Belupo 2016–2017
 Lorik Aliu – (KOS) – Prishtina 2012–2015
 Klodian Arbëri – (SVN) – Maribor 2000–(2001)
 Habib Arifi – (MKD) – Baškimi Kumanovo 2006–2007
 Tedi Baholli – (KOS) – Liria Prizren 2009–2010
 Edvan Bakaj – (KOS) – Liria Prizren 2017–2018, Drita Gjilan 2018–2019
 Elis Bakaj – (CRO) – RNK Split (2016)–2017
 Bekim Balaj – (CRO) – Rijeka 2014–2016
 Artan Bano – (CRO, SVN) – Pazinka 1993–1994, 1997–1998, Svoboda 1994–1995
 Arlind Basha – (KOS) – Hajduk Split 2013–(2014)
 Elton Basriu – (KOS) – Liria Prizren 2017–2018, Trepça '89 2018–2019, Dukagjini 2019–2020, 2021–present
 Berat Beciri – (MKD, SVN) – Škendija Tetovo 2018–2019, Triglav Kranj 2019–2020, Struga 2021–2022
 Valon Beka – (KOS) – Trepça '89 2009–2011
 Fabian Beqja – (KOS) – Gjilani 2021–2023
 Ardit Berisha – (KOS) – Dukagjini 2019–2020
 Etrit Berisha – (KOS) – KF 2 Korriku 2006–2008
 Ismet Berisha – (SRB) – Železnik Belgrade 1997–1998
 Diellor Beseni – (KOS) – Liria Prizren 2018–(2019), Dukagjini 2019–(2020), Besa Pejë 2020–(2021)
 Amir Bilali – (SVN, MKD, MNE) – Celje 2013–2015, Rabotnički Skopje (2017)–2018, Shkupi 2018–2019, Sutjeska Nikšić 2022–present
 Ramiz Bisha – (Yug/MNE) – Budućnost Podgorica 1991–1992
 Olti Bishani – (KOS) – Trepça 2011–2012
 Erjon Bogdani – (CRO) – Zagreb 1998–2000
 Kliton Bozgo – (SVN) – Maribor 1993–1994, 1998–2000, 2004–2005, Olimpija 1994–1998, Drava Ptuj 2005–2006
 Ervin Bulku – (CRO) – Hajduk Split 2010–2011
 Mark Bushaj – (CRO) – Hrvatski Dragovoljac (2021)–2022
 Arbër Bytyqi – (KOS) – Llapi 2022–present
 Klisman Cake – (MKD) – Struga 2019–2022, Škendija Tetovo 2021–present
 Ilir Çaushllari – (SVN) – Korotan Prevalje 1995–1997, Rudar Velenje 1997–1999
 Endri Çekiçi – (CRO, SVN) – Dinamo Zagreb 2014–2018, Lokomotiva Zagreb 2015–2017, Olimpija Ljubljana 2018–2020
 Semiran Çela – (CRO) – Zadar (2009)–2010
 Drilon Cenaj – (BIH) – Čelik Zenica 2019–present
 Eraldo Çinari – (CRO, MKD) – Istra 1961 (2018)–2019, Škendija Tetovo 2022–present
 Sokol Cikalleshi – (CRO) – RNK Split 2014–2015
 Dionis Çikani – (KOS) – Drenica 2020–(2021)
 Geri Çipi – (SVN) – Maribor 1998–2000
 Enis Çokaj – (CRO) – Lokomotiva Zagreb 2019–2022
 Armando Cungu – (KOS) – Flamurtari Prishtina 2004–2005
 Erli Çupi – (KOS) – Ferizaj 2018–2020, 2022–present
 Debatik Curri – (KOS) – Prishtina 2003–2005, 2016–2018
 Arbër Çyrbja – (KOS) – Gjilani 2020–2021
 Florian Daci – (KOS) – Liria Prizren 2018–present
 Armend Dallku – (KOS) – Prishtina 2003–2004, 2016–2018
 Orgen Dava – (KOS) – Trepça '89 2018–present
 Fjoralb Deliaj – (MKD) – Struga 2019–(2020)
 Ardit Deliu – (CRO) – RNK Split (2016)–2017
 Gjergji Dëma – (SVN) – Svoboda 1994–1995, Rudar Velenje 1995–1997, Vevče Ljubljana 1997–1998, Beltinci 1998–1999, Dravograd 1999–2000, Ljubljana 2000–2005
 Angelo Demaj – (MKD) – Struga 2019–2020
 Besir Demiri – (MKD) – Škendija Tetovo 2014–2017, Vardar Skopje 2016–2018, Shkupi 2022–present
 Ernis Dhimitri – (KOS) – Drenica 2022–present
 Bruno Dita – (MKD) – Škendija Tetovo 2020–present
 Enkeleid Dobi – (CRO, SVN) – Varteks 1997–1998, 1999–2000, Beltinci 1998–1999
 Albi Doka – (CRO) – HNK Gorica 2020–2022
 David Domgjoni – (KOS) – Liria Prizren 2017–2018
 Edmond Dosti – (SVN) – Olimpija 1994–1997
 Mehmet Dragusha – (SRB, SVN) – Prishtina 1996–1998, Maribor 1998–2000
 Denis Duda – (KOS) – Vushtrria (2015)–2016
 Amer Duka – (KOS) – Dukagjini (2021)–2022
 Jurgen Dushkaj – (KOS) – Llapi 2021–(2022)
 Erlis Frashëri – (KOS) – Gjilani 2019–2020, Drenica 2020–(2021)
 Stivi Frashëri – (KOS) – Ballkani 2021–present
 Adnan Gashi – (SRB) – Prishtina 1995–1997
 Orgest Gava – (KOS) – Trepça '89 2018–2019, Dukagjini (2019)–2020
 Enis Gavazaj – (KOS, MKD) – Prishtina 2011–2013, 2020–2021, Struga 2022–present
 Zenel Gavazaj – (KOS) – Liria Prizren 2017–2018, Drenica 2022–present
 Eglentin Gjoni – (KOS) – Llapi (2020)–2021, Drenica 2020–(2021), Ulpiana (2021)–2022
 Endrit Grainca – (KOS) – Ferizaj 2013–2014, Prishtina 2014–2016
 Bedri Greca – (KOS) – Gjilani (2019)–2020, Feronikeli 2020–2021
 Eros Grezda – (SVN, CRO) – Zavrč 2014–2015, Lokomotiva Zagreb 2015–2017, Osijek 2017–2018, 2019–2022, Šibenik 2021–(2022)
 Nazmi Gripshi – (KOS) – Ballkani 2020–present
 Sindrit Guri – (MKD) – Škendija Tetovo 2021–2022
 Arsen Hajdari – (KOS) – Drenica 2010–2011
 Mahir Halili – (SVN) – ND Gorica 1998–2000
 Rrahman Hallaçi – (MKD) – Škendija Tetovo 1999–2000
 Qendrim Hasanaj – (SVN) – Triglav Kranj 2018–2020
 Besnik Hasi – (Yug/CRO, SRB) – Zagreb 1990–1991, 1992–1993, Prishtina 1991–1992, 1993–1994
 Besim Haxhiu – (CRO) – Mladost 127 1998–1999, Međimurje 2003–2006
 Egland Haxho – (MKD, KOS) – Renova 2016–2017, Llapi 2018–2019, Prishtina 2019–2022
 Rubin Hebaj – (SVN, MKD) – Domžale 2017–2019, Škendija Tetovo 2020–2022
 Ardit Hila – (KOS) – Prishtina 2019–2020, Gjilani 2020–2021
 Alban Hoti – (SVN) – Izola 2002–2003
 Alban Hoxha – (KOS) – Kosova Vushtrri 2009–2010
 Dritan Hoxha – (CRO) – Dubrovnik 1919 1993–1994
 Rustem Hoxha – (KOS) – Ballkani 2021–present
 Geri Hoxhaj – (KOS) – Vushtrria (2015)–2016
 Vilfor Hysa – (KOS) – Gjilani 2018–2019, Drenica (2019)–2020
 Renato Hyshmeri – (KOS) – Trepça '89 2018–2019
 Omar Imeri – (MKD) – Rabotnički Skopje 2014–2017, Shkupi 2017–2018, 2021–(2022), Škendija Tetovo 2018–2020
 Lauren Ismailaj – (KOS) – Drita Gjilan (2017)–2018, Feronikeli 2017–2018
 Marsel Ismailgeci – (BIH) – Zrinjski Mostar 2022–present
 Ysni Ismaili – (MKD) – Pelister Bitola 2020–2022
 Ardian Ismajli – (KOS, CRO) – Prishtina 2015–2016, Hajduk Split 2016–2020
 Paolo Ivani – (KOS) – Vëllaznimi Gjakova 2017–present
 Ahmed Januzi – (KOS) – Prishtina 2004–2006, 2016–2018, 2019–2020, Kosova Vushtrri 2006–2007, Llapi 2018–2019, 2020–2021, Dukagjini 2021–present
 Ardit Jaupaj – (KOS) – Flamurtari Prishtina (2017)–2018, Feronikeli 2017–(2018)
 Albert Junçaj – (MNE) – Dečić Tuzi 2014–2015
 Redi Jupi – (CRO, SVN) – Istra Pula 1996–1997, Rijeka (1997)–1998, Vevče Ljubljana 1997–(1998)
 David Kacaj – (KOS) – Kosova Vushtrri (2015)–2016
 Ervis Kaja – (KOS) – Liria Prizren 2017–(2018), Drita Gjilan (2018)–2019
 Klaudio Kajtazi – (CRO) – Dubrava 1993–1994
 Sherif Kallaku – (CRO) – Lokomotiva Zagreb 2020–2022
 Mikel Kaloshi – (KOS) – Drenica 2019–2021, (2021)–2022
 Suad Kaloshi – (KOS) – Trepça 2011–2012
 Xhevair Kapllani – (MKD) – Baškimi Kumanovo (2003)–2004
 Erando Karabeci – (KOS) – Prishtina 2021–2022
 Bernard Karrica – (CRO, SVN) – Rijeka 2021–present, Hrvatski Dragovoljac 2021–(2022), ND Gorica 2022–present
 Lirim Kelmendi – (CRO) – Istra 1961 2016–2017
 Enver Koca – (SVN) – Rudar Velenje 2003–2004
 Enea Koliçi – (KOS) – Gjilani 2020–present
 Kristi Kote – (KOS) – Liria Prizren 2017–present
 Loka Kotrri – (Yug/MNE) – Obilić Nikšić 1938–1939
 Toni Kotrri – (Yug/MNE) – Obilić Nikšić 1938–1939
 Leon Kozi – (KOS) – Drenica 2022–present
 Kristi Kullaj – (KOS) – Feronikeli 2019–2022
 Albin Krasniqi – (KOS) – Drita Gjilan 2018–present
 Blerim Krasniqi – (KOS) – Gjilani 2021–2022
 Gezim Krasniqi – (MKD) – Rabotnički Skopje 2017–2018
 Eri Lamçja – (KOS) – Drita Gjilan 2018–present
 Vokli Laroshi – (KOS) – Llapi 2022–present
 Liridon Latifi – (KOS) – Flamurtari Prishtina 2011–2012, Prishtina 2012–2015
 Elmir Lekaj – (KOS) – Arbëria 2020–(2021), Ulpiana 2021–(2022)
 Senad Lekaj – (KOS) – Trepça (2011)–2012
 Gresild Lika – (KOS) – Arbëria 2020–(2021)
 Sabien Lilaj – (CRO, KOS) – Lokomotiva Zagreb 2011–2012, Prishtina 2020–2021
 Fabian Lokaj – (SVN) – Koper 2015–2016
 Artur Magani – (KOS) – Liria Prizren 2017–2018, Feronikeli 2018–2019, Ballkani 2019–2020
 Arber Malaj – (KOS) – KEK Kastriot (2010)–2011
 Enes Maliqi – (SRB) – Milicionar Belgrade 1998–1999
 Elvir Maloku – (CRO, SVN, MNE) – Hajduk Split 2013–2016, Aluminij (2018)–2019, Dečić Tuzi 2020–(2021)
 Progon Maloku – (KOS) – Dukagjini 2022–present
 Leondrit Maraj – (KOS) – Prishtina 2012–2013
 Albion Marku – (CRO) – Lokomotiva Zagreb 2019–2022
 Kristi Marku – (KOS) – Ferizaj (2018)–2019
 Edi Martini – (SVN, KOS) – Vevče Ljubljana 1994–1995, Flamurtari Prishtina 2003–2005
 Arens Mateli – (KOS) – Ballkani 2021–2022, Prishtina (2022)–2023, Gjilani 2022–present
 Atdhe Mazari – (MKD) – Struga 2019–2021, Pobeda Prilep 2022–present 
 Valentino Mazreku – (BIH) – Velež Mostar 2008–2009
 Erion Mehilli – (SVN) – Korotan Prevalje 1995–1996, Rudar Velenje 1996–1997, Dravograd 1997–2000, Koper 2000–2002, Izola 2002–2003
 Admir Mehja – (KOS) – Liria Prizren 2011–2012
 Rexhep Memini – (KOS) – Trepça '89 2017–present
 Hysen Memolla – (SVN, CRO) – Koper 2015–2016, Hajduk Split 2016–2019
 Jon Mersinaj – (CRO) – Lokomotiva Zagreb 2019–present
 Sokol Meta – (SVN, CRO) – Mura 1994–1995, Šibenik 1995–1996, Zadar 1996–1997
 Gledi Mici – (MKD, KOS) – Škendija Tetovo 2018–2020, Prishtina 2020–present 
 Arbën Milori – (SVN) – Izola 1994–1995
 Arbër Mone – (KOS) – Ferizaj 2018–2019
 Blerind Morina – (KOS) – Dukagjini 2022–present
 Gentian Muça – (KOS) – Prishtina 2020–present
 Ledjon Muçaj – (KOS) – Gjilani 2018–present
 Ndue Mujeci – (MKD, MNE) – Akademija Pandev 2019–(2020), Jezero Plav 2020–2022
 Devi Muka – (CRO) – Varteks 1999–2002
 Almedin Murati – (KOS) – Liria Prizren (2013)–2014, Drita Gjilan 2014–2017, Vllaznia Pozheran 2017–2018
 Henrik Nerguti – (SVN) – Mura 2021–present
 Haxhi Neziraj – (KOS) – Drita Gjilan 2017–2019, Feronikeli (2019)–2020
 Mërgim Neziri – (KOS) – Prishtina 2016–present
 Ansi Nika – (KOS) – Gjilani 2018–present
 Adnan Oçelli – (CRO) – Zadar 1993–1995, Orijent Rijeka 1996–1997
 Leutrim Osaj – (SVN) – Nafta Lendava 2011–2012
 Viktor Paço – (SVN, CRO) – Maribor 1996–1998, Hajduk Split 1997–(1998)
 Klodian Papa – (SVN) – Vevče Ljubljana 1994–1995
 Saimir Patushi – (BIH) – Radnički Lukavac (1999)–2000, Krajina Cazin 1999–2001, Posušje 2000–2001, Iskra Bugojno 2000–(2001)
 Jorgo Pëllumbi – (CRO) – Varaždin 2020–2021, 2022–present
 Arbri Pengu – (MKD) – Struga 2022–present
 Brunild Pepa – (KOS) – Gjilani 2018–present
 Ardit Peposhi – (KOS) – Llapi 2020–2022
 Denis Peposhi – (KOS) – Drenica 2017–2018, Liria Prizren 2018–2019
 Miklovan Pere – (MKD) – Struga 2021–present
 Bledar Përfati – (KOS) – Trepça 2011–2012
 Elvis Prençi – (KOS) – Llapi 2018–2022, Prishtina (2019)–2020
 Besnik Prenga – (CRO) – Istra Pula (1993)–1994, Dubrava 1993–(1994), Zadar 1994–1995, Mladost 127 1996–1998, Dinamo Zagreb (1997)–1998, Čakovec 2000–2001
 Herdi Prenga – (CRO) – Lokomotiva Zagreb 2013–2017, Inter Zaprešić 2017–2019
 Gerhard Progni – (KOS) – Gjilani 2019–2022, Llapi 2022–present
 Kamer Qaka – (MKD) – Škendija Tetovo 2020–2022, 2022–present
 Harallamb Qaqi – (KOS) – Drenica 2020–(2021)
 Renaldo Rama – (KOS) – Ferizaj 2009–2011
 Behar Ramadani – (KOS) – Drenica 2020–(2021)
 Besir Ramadani – (MKD, KOS) – Shkupi 2018–2020, Struga 2020–2022, Prishtina 2022–present
 Ylber Ramadani – (KOS) – Ferizaj 2013–2015, Prishtina 2014–(2015), Drita Gjilani (2015)–2016
 Oltion Rapa – (KOS) – Gjilani 2019–2022
 Irdi Rapaj – (SVN) – ND Gorica 2013–2014
 Donald Rapo – (KOS) – Drenica 2020–(2021)
 Milot Rashica – (KOS) – Kosova Vushtrri 2013–2015
 Ermir Rezi – (KOS) – Ulpiana 2021–2022
 Almir Rexhepi – (MKD) – Škendija Tetovo 2018–(2019), 2022–present
 Erjon Rizvanolli – (CRO) – Zagreb 2001–2003
 Odise Roshi – (CRO) – Rijeka 2015–2016
 Amir Rrahmani – (KOS, CRO) – Hysi 2011–2012, Drenica 2012–2013, RNK Split 2015–2016, Lokomotiva Zagreb 2016–2017, Dinamo Zagreb 2017–present
 Flamur Rrustemaj – (SVN) – Svoboda 1993–1998
 Jasir Rrustja – (KOS) – Trepça 2011–2012
 Shkëlzen Ruçi – (KOS) – Gjilani 2019–2021
 Hajdin Salihu – (KOS, CRO) – Llapi 2018–2021, Lokomotiva Zagreb 2020–present
 Jetmir Sefa – (KOS) – Liria Prizren 2017–2018
 Ilir Seferi – (BIH) – Travnik 2007–2008
 Jeton Seferi – (BIH) – Travnik 2007–2008
 Lindon Selahi – (CRO) – Rijeka 2021–present
 Labinot Shabani – (KOS) – Prishtina 2013–2015, Gjilani (2015)–2016, Ferizaj 2015–20_
 Arlis Shala – (KOS) – Llapi (2020)–2021, Drenica 2021–present
 Klevis Shaqe – (KOS) – Drenica 2020–(2021)
 Shefit Shefiti – (MKD, KOS) – Škendija Tetovo 2016–2020, Renova 2019–2022, Prishtina 2022–present
 Ylli Shehu – (CRO) – Šibenik 1993–1995, 1997–1998
 Rahim Sherifi – (Yug/SRB) – Partizan Belgrade 19__–19__
 Silvester Shkalla – (KOS) – Ulpiana 2021–2022
 Bledi Shkëmbi – (CRO) – Rijeka 2001–2004, Kamen Ingrad 2004–2005
 Maringlen Shoshi – (KOS) – Trepça '89 2018–present
 Zamir Shpuza – (Yug/MNE) – Budućnost Podgorica 1991–1992
 Ilir Sillo – (SVN) – Rudar Velenje 1994–1997, Korotan Prevalje 1997–2001, Koper 2000–(2001), Triglav Kranj 2001–2002
 Vioresin Sinani – (CRO) – Varteks 1999–2001
 Erkan Spahija – (KOS) – Trepça '89 2019–(2020)
 Andri Stafa – (KOS) – Llapi 2022–present
 Albert Stroni – (SRB) – Partizan Belgrade 1992–1993
 Xhevahir Sukaj – (CRO) – Zagreb (2010)–2011
 Klodian Sulollari – (KOS) – Liria Prizren 2009–2010, Ballkani 2010–(2011)
 Arsen Sykaj – (KOS) – Drenica 2017–present
 Alsid Tafili – (KOS) – Liria Prizren 2009–(2010), 2011–(2012)
 Francesco Tahiraj – (SVN, CRO) – Zavrč 2015–2016, Aluminij 2016–2018, Hajduk Split 2018–2020, Lokomotiva Zagreb 2020–2022, Radomlje 2022–present
 Dodë Tahiri – (Yug/MNE) – Budućnost Titograd 1946–1949
 Bruno Telushi – (CRO) – Slaven Belupo (2017)–2018
 Olsi Teqja – (MKD) – Škendija Tetovo 2017–2018
 Lorenc Trashi – (KOS) – Ballkani 2022–present
 Indrit Tuci – (CRO) – Lokomotiva Zagreb 2018–present
 Xhuljan Turhani – (KOS) – Llapi 2017–2018
 Gerald Tushe – (KOS) – Liria Prizren (2018)–2019
 Augustin Ujka – (CRO) – Mladost 127 1995–1997
 Myrto Uzuni – (CRO) – Lokomotiva Zagreb 2018–2020
 Fatmir Vata – (CRO) – Samobor 1995–1998, Slaven Belupo 1998–1999, Vukovar '91 1998–(1999)
 Franc Veliu – (KOS) – Gjilani 2019–2022
 Emiljano Vila – (CRO) – Dinamo Zagreb 2009–2011, Lokomotiva Zagreb (2009)–2010
 Endrit Vrapi – (KOS) – Liria Prizren 2017–present
 Erjon Vucaj – (KOS, MNE) – Drita Gjilan 2018–2022, Dečić Tuzi 2021–present
 Altin Xhahysa – (KOS) – Prishtina 2001–2002, Ferizaj 200_–200_
 Agon Xhaka – (KOS) – Prishtina 2016–2021, Llapi 2015–(2016), Besa Pejë 2019–2021, Malisheva 2021–present
 Faton Xhemaili – (SRB) – Radnik Surdulica 2018–2019
 Arbin Zejnullai – (MKD, CRO) – Škendija Tetovo 2016–2021, Lokomotiva Zagreb (2021)–2022, Rabotnički Skopje 2021–(2022)
 Amarildo Zela – (CRO, BIH) – Neretva Metković 1995–1996, Šibenik 1996–1997, Vukovar '91 1997–2000, Posušje 2000–2001, Kamen Ingrad 2001–2002
 Valdo Zeqaj – (KOS) – Flamurtari Prishtina 2017–(2018), 2019–(2020), Drenica (2020)–2021
 Agim Zeka – (KOS) – Drita Gjilan (2021)–2022, Prishtina 2021–(2022), Drenica 2022–present

Algeria
 Monsef Bakrar – (CRO) – Istra 1961 2022–present
 Adda Djeziri – (SRB) – Vojvodina (2017)–2018
 Walid Hamidi – (MKD) – Shkupi 2021–present
 Zakaria Nimani – (MKD) – Metalurg Skopje 2015–(2016)
 Yacine Si Salem – (KOS) – Besa Pejë 2016–2017
 El Arbi Hillel Soudani – (CRO) – Dinamo Zagreb 2013–2018
 Nassim Zitouni  – (BIH) – Tuzla City (2019)–2020

Angola
 Alexander Christovão – (SRB) – Javor Ivanjica 2016–2017
 Wilson Eduardo – (CRO) – Dinamo Zagreb 2014–2015
 Anderson Emanuel – (CRO) – Rudeš 2017–2018
 Diangi Matusiwa – (SVN) – Mura 05 (2012)–2013
 Aldair Neto – (MKD) – Škendija Tetovo 2019–(2020), Pelister Bitola 2020–2021
 Fortunato da Silva – (MKD) – Tikvesh (2021)–2022
 Wadir – (KOS) – Trepça '89 2022–present

Antigua and Barbuda
 Jorrin John – (SVN) – Domžale 2014–(2015)
 Josh Parker – (SVN, SRB) – Domžale 2013–2015, Red Star Belgrade 2014–2016

Argentina
 Federico Acosta – (MKD) – Akademija Pandev 2022–present
 Iván Gonzalo Arribillaga – (MNE) – Lovćen Cetinje (2016)–2017
 Ignacio Bailone – (CRO) – Šibenik 2020–2022
 Hernán Barcos – (SRB) – Red Star Belgrade 2007–2008
 Hernán Bardas – (SVN) – Tabor Sežana 2001–2002
 Guido Barreyro – (SRB) – Inđija (2010)–2011
 Javier Bayk – (MNE) – Bokelj Kotor 2016–2017, Iskra Danilovgrad (2017)–2018, Rudar Pljevlja 2017–2018
 Alan Bonansea – (CRO) – Lokomotiva Zagreb 2020–(2021)
 Denis Brizuela – (MNE) – Jezero Plav 2020–(2021)
 Marcelo Calamante – (SVN) – Drava Ptuj 2007–2008
 Adrián Calello – (CRO) – Dinamo Zagreb 2008–2013
 Sebastián Calleja – (SVN) – Olimpija 2001–2002
 César Canario – (BIH) – Leotar Trebinje 2010–(2011)
 Mauro Carabajal – (SRB) – Vojvodina 1998–(1999)
 Agustín Cardozo – (CRO) – Istra 1961 (2018)–2019
 Facundo Cáseres – (CRO) – Istra 1961 2021–present
 Carlos Chacana – (SVN) – Celje 2008–2009
 Maximiliano Chevrot – (BIH) – Široki Brijeg 2010–(2011)
 Franco Chiavarini – (CRO) – Zagreb 2010–(2011)
 Horacio Clemente – (SVN) – Koper 2001–2003
 Fabian Coronel – (BIH) – Leotar Trebinje 2010–(2011)
 Leandro Cufré – (CRO) – Dinamo Zagreb 2009–2012
 Franco Dalmao – (BIH) – Olimpik Sarajevo 2010–2011
 Gonzalo Desio – (CRO) – Istra 1961 2021–2022
 Juan Di Lorenzo – (KOS) – Llapi 2022–present
 Agustín Doffo – (BIH, SVN) – Tuzla City 2020–2022, Olimpija Ljubljana 2022–present
 Rodrigo Faust – (MNE) – Jezero Plav 2021–(2022), OFK Petrovac 2022–present
 Ramón Fernández – (CRO) – Rijeka 2008–2010
 Darío Ferreyra – (BIH) – Velež Mostar 2019–2022, Tuzla City 2021–2023
 Nahuel Franco – (MKD) – Akademija Pandev 2022–present
 Gonzalo Gamarra – (CRO) – Slaven Belupo 2020–2022
 Mateo García – (SRB) – Red Star Belgrade 2019–2020
 Jonathan Germano – (CRO) – Rijeka (2009)–2010
 Marco Giovanetti – (SVN) – Bela Krajina 2006–2007
 Diego Román Goyoaga – (CRO) – Varteks 1995–1996
 Javier Grbec – (SVN) – Drava Ptuj 2007–2009
 Ignacio Guerrico – (SVN) – Maribor 2020–present, Tabor Sežana (2021)–2022
 Federico Haberkorn – (MKD) – Škendija Tetovo (2016)–2017
 Nicolás Herranz – (MKD) – Vardar Skopje 2018–2019
 Lucas Mario Horvat – (SVN) – Drava Ptuj 2005–2009, Interblock 2009–2010, Domžale 2010–2012, 2014–2017, Aluminij 2017–2021
 Luis Ibáñez – (CRO, SRB, BIH) – Dinamo Zagreb 2008–2013, 2014–2015, Red Star Belgrade 2015–2016, Zrinjski Mostar 2019–2021
 Alessio Innocenti – (SVN) – ND Gorica 2014–2015
 Diego Jaime – (MNE) – Budućnost Podgorica 2007–2008
 Cristian Jeandet – (SRB) – Sartid Smederevo 1998–2000
 Diego Jorajuria – (CRO) – Lokomotiva Zagreb (2009)–2010
 Maximiliano Klebčar – (SVN) – Celje (2010)–2011
 Juan Pablo Kresser – (BIH) – Olimpik Sarajevo 2010–2011
 Gustavo López – (MNE) – Budućnost Podgorica 2007–2009
 Ariel Lucero – (MNE) – Budućnost Podgorica 2022–present
 Hernan Marcos – (SRB) – Vojvodina 1998–(1999)
 Gonzalo Martinez – (BIH) – Široki Brijeg (2009)–2010
 Gonzalo Menéndez – (MKD) – Škendija Tetovo (2016)–2017
 Ramón Miérez – (CRO) – Istra 1961 2018–2019, Osijek 2020–present
 Pablo Migliore – (CRO) – Dinamo Zagreb (2013)–2014
 Julián Montenegro – (MNE) – Lovćen Cetinje 2016–(2017), OFK Grbalj 2017–2019, Arsenal Tivat 2022–present
 Pablo Mouche – (SRB) – Red Star Belgrade (2016)–2017
 Tomás Oneto – (CRO) – Istra 1961 (2018)–2019
 Lucas Ontivero – (SVN) – Olimpija Ljubljana (2015)–2016
 Pablo Ostrowski – (SRB) – Vojvodina 2007–2009
 Elian Parrino – (MKD) – Škendija Tetovo (2016)–2017
 Lucas Pittinari – (SVN) – Tabor Sežana 2019–(2020)
 Matías Porcari – (SRB) – Radnički Kragujevac (2013)–2014
 Cristian Revainera – (BIH) – Čelik Zenica 2007–2008
 Diego Romero – (SVN) – Mura 2002–2003
 Ezequiel Rosendo – (MKD) – Bregalnica Štip (2012)–2013
 Renzo Rossi – (MNE) – OFK Grbalj 2010–(2011)
 Lisandro Sacripanti – (SVN) – Celje 2008–2009
 Martin Šarić – (CRO, SVN) – Zagreb 2001–2002, Rijeka 2002–2004, Ljubljana 2004–2005, Celje 2008–2009
 Lucas Scaglia – (CRO) – Rijeka (2014)–2015
 Leonardo Sigali – (CRO) – Dinamo Zagreb 2014–2018
 Claudio Spinelli – (SVN) – Koper 2020–2021
 Diego Suarez – (SRB) – OFK Belgrade (2006)–2007
 Guillermo Suarez – (CRO) – Dinamo Zagreb 2008–2010, Inter Zaprešić 2009–(2010)
 Leandro Teijo – (SVN) – Koper 2016–2017
 Agustín Torassa – (KOS) – Gjilani 2021–2022
 Mariano Torrens – (SVN) – Korotan Prevalje (2002)–2003
 Maximiliano Vallejo – (MNE) – Budućnost Podgorica 2008–2009
 Juan Manuel Varea – (BIH) – Široki Brijeg 2009–2012, Željezničar Sarajevo 2014–2015
 Ignacio Varela – (CRO) – Istra 1961 2015–2016
 Julián Velázquez – (CRO) – Hajduk Split 2015–2016
 Nicolás Vélez – (CRO) – Hajduk Split 2015–2016
 Leandro Veliz – (BIH) – Široki Brijeg 2009–2010
 Alex Vigo – (SRB) – Red Star Belgrade 2022–present
 Luis Vila – (CRO) – Istra 1961 (2018)–2019
 Santiago Villafañe – (CRO) – RNK Split (2016)–2017
 Tomás Villoldo – (SRB) – OFK Belgrade 2015–2016
 Juan Vitagliano – (SVN) – Koper 2001–2005, 2007–2009, Olimpija 2004–(2005)
 Andrés Vombergar – (SVN) – Olimpija Ljubljana 2017–2018, 2020–2021
 Gonzalo Zárate – (MKD, KOS) – Borec Veles (2021)–2022, Ulpiana 2021–(2022)

Armenia
 David Arshakyan – (CRO) – HNK Gorica (2018)–2019
 Tigran Barseghyan – (MKD) – Vardar Skopje 2016–2019
 Artak Dashyan – (MKD) – Vardar Skopje 2014–2016
 Hovhannes Grigoryan – (SRB) – Banat Zrenjanin 2006–(2007)
 Hovhannes Hambardzumyan – (MKD) – Vardar Skopje 2014–2018
 Tigran Kandikyan – (MKD) – Rabotnički Skopje 2010–2012, Škendija Tetovo 2014–2015, Makedonija GP 2016–2017, FK Skopje 2017–2018
 David Manoyan – (MKD) – Rabotnički Skopje 2018–2019
 Artur Miranyan – (MKD) – Vardar Skopje 2014–2015
 Vardan Pogosyan – (MKD) – Rabotnički Skopje (2017)–2018
 Sargis Vardanov – (Yug/MKD) – Građanski Skoplje 1923–1924
 Artur Yedigaryan – (SRB) – Proleter Novi Sad (2019)–2020

Australia
 David Aceski – (SRB) – OFK Belgrade 2001–2002
 Dennis Alilovic – (SVN) – Maribor 1998–1999, Beltinci 1999–2000
 Chris Antunovic – (CRO) – Hajduk Split 2003–2004
 Tomislav Arčaba – (SRB) – BSK Borča 2010–2012, OFK Belgrade 2015–2016
 Igor Arsovski – (CRO, MKD) – Osijek 2003–2004, Sileks Kratovo 2004–2006
 Anthony Atanasov – (MKD) – Rabotnički Skopje (2012)–2013
 Mark Aouad – (MNE, MKD, SVN) – Lovćen Cetinje 2016–(2017), Pobeda Prilep (2017)–2018, Ankaran Hrvatini 2017–(2018)
 Eli Babalj – (SRB) – Red Star Belgrade (2012)–2013
 Zeljko Babic – (Yug/BIH) – Borac Banja Luka 1990–1991
 Eddy Bosnar – (CRO) – Dinamo Zagreb 2000–2001, 2005–2006, Rijeka 2005–2006
 Steven Bozinovski – (SRB) – Radnički Niš 2002–2003
 Branko Buljevic – (Yug/SRB) – OFK Belgrade 1966–1968
 Matthew Byrne – (SRB) – Donji Srem 2011–2013
 Michael Curcija – (SRB) – Partizan Belgrade 2000–2001
 Michael Cvetkovski – (MKD) – Pelister Bitola 2006–2007, 2009–2011, Belasica 2007–2009, Rabotnički Skopje (2012)–2013
 Ante Čović – (CRO) – Dinamo Zagreb 2001–2002
 Jason Davidson – (CRO, SVN) – Rijeka (2017)–2018, Olimpija Ljubljana 2017–(2018)
 Miloš Degenek – (SRB) – Red Star Belgrade (2018)–2019, 2019–2022
 Bobby Dragas – (SRB) – Red Star Belgrade 2000–2001
 Ajdin Fetahagić – (BIH) – Velež Mostar 2015–2016
 Tyrese Francois – (CRO) – HNK Gorica (2022)–2023
 Anthony Grdic – (CRO) – Šibenik 1993–1999, 2004–2005, Hajduk Split 1999–2001, Istra 1961 2004–2005
 Doni Grdić – (CRO) – Šibenik 2020–present
 Labinot Haliti – (CRO) – Slaven Belupo 2007–2008
 Steve Horvat – (CRO) – Hajduk Split 1995–1996
 Milan Ivanovic – (Yug/SRB) – Red Star Belgrade 1978–1982, 1985–1986, 1988–1989, OFK Beograd 1982–1985, Radnički Niš 1986–1988
 Mile Jedinak – (CRO) – Varteks 2003–2004
 Mario Jermen – (CRO) – Zadar 1998–1999
 Aleksandar Jovanovic – (SRB, BIH) – Vojvodina 2007–2008, Hajduk Kula (2011)–2012, Željezničar Sarajevo 2019–(2020)
 Deni Jurić – (SVN, CRO) – Triglav Kranj 2018–2019, Šibenik 2020–2021, Dinamo Zagreb 2021–present, HNK Gorica (2022)–2023, Rijeka 2022–present 
 Tomi Juric – (CRO) – Lokomotiva Zagreb 2011–2012, Inter Zaprešić 2012–2013
 Anthony Kalik – (CRO) – Hajduk Split 2015–2017, (2019)–2020, 2022–present Rudeš (2018)–2019, HNK Gorica 2019–2022
 Fran Karačić – (CRO) – Lokomotiva Zagreb 2015–2021, Dinamo Zagreb (2020)–2021 
 Eddie Krncevic – (Yug/CRO) – Dinamo Zagreb 1981–1984
 Paul Lapić – (CRO) – Zagreb 1998–2000
 Steven Luštica – (CRO) – Hajduk Split 2011–2013, Inter Zaprešić 2018–2019
 Robert Markovac – (CRO) – Hajduk Split 1992–1993
 Krešimir Marušić – (CRO) – Radnik Velika Gorica 1992–1993, Segesta Sisak 1993–1995, Dubrovnik 1919 1993–(1994), Inker Zaprešić 1995–1996
 Andrew Marveggio – (SRB, MNE) – Zemun (2018)–2019, Mačva Šabac 2018–2020, OFK Petrovac 2020–(2021), Mornar Bar (2021)–2022, Jezero Plav 2021–present
 Ljubo Miličević – (CRO) – Hajduk Split 2011–2012
 Ante Miličić – (CRO) – Rijeka 1999–2001
 Branko Milosevic – (Yug/CRO) – Dinamo Zagreb 1982–1983
 Ante Moric – (CRO) – Zadar 1996–(1997), 2006–2007
 Tomislav Mrčela – (CRO) – Hrvatski Dragovoljac 2013–2014, Lokomotiva Zagreb 2014–2016
 Dylan Nikolovski – (MKD) – Rabotnički Skopje 2015–2016
 Žarko Odžakov – (Yug/MAK) – Vardar Skopje 1974–1983
 Dejan Pandurević – (SRB) – Zemun 2017–2018
 Jovo Pavlović – (BIH) – Borac Banja Luka (2012)–2013
 Anthony Pelikan – (CRO) – Dinamo Zagreb (2004)–2005
 Sasho Petrovski – (MKD) – Vardar Skopje 1992–1993, Pelister Bitola 1998–1999
 Ivo Prskalo – (Yug/BIH) – Velež Mostar 1967–1976
 Sasa Radulovic – (BIH) – Čelik Zenica 1995–1996, 2006–2007
 Andy Rakic – (CRO) – Zagreb 2003–2004
 Mark Rizoski – (MKD) – Makedonija GP 2016–(2017)
 Mislav Saric – (CRO) – Kamen Ingrad 2006–2007
 Josip Skoko – (CRO) – Hajduk Split 1995–1999, 2008–2010
 Tony Stojkovski – (MKD) – FK Skopje (2017)–2018, Pelister Bitola 2017–2019
 Roko Strika – (CRO) – Zagreb 2014–2016
 Željko Susa – (CRO)– Hajduk Split 2001–2002
 Milan Susak – (SRB) – Vojvodina 2002–2007
 Goran Talevski – (CRO) – Hajduk Split 2003–2004, Šibenik 2004–2006
 Dean Tomeski – (MKD) – Ohrid 2011–(2012), Vardar Skopje 2012–(2013), Makedonija GP 2013–2014
 Steven Ugarković – (CRO) – Osijek 2013–2016
 Doug Utjesenovic – (Yug/SRB) – OFK Belgrade 1967–1969
 Adriano Varnier – (SVN) – Koper 2008–2011
 Goran Veljanovski – (MKD) – Cementarnica 55 (2005)–2006
 Mark Viduka – (CRO) – Dinamo Zagreb 1995–1998
 Aleks Vrteski – (MKD) – Pobeda Prilep 2007–2009
 Goran Zarić – (SRB) – Borac Čačak 1995–1996, Vojvodina 1996–1998, Čukarički Belgrade 2002–2004
 Antoni Zmire – (CRO) – Rijeka 1994–1995
 Nikola Zonjić – (MNE) – Kom Podgorica 2007–2008
 Milan Zorić – (BIH) – Leotar Trebinje 2011–2012

Austria
 Denis Adamov – (SVN) – Domžale 2020–2022
 Christian Aflenzer – (CRO) – Istra Pula 1996–1998
 Patrik Barbic – (SVN) – Livar Ivančna Gorica 2007–(2008)
 Daniel Bartosch – (SVN) – Drava Ptuj 2008–2009
 Alois Beranek – (Yug/CRO) – Concordia Zagreb 1923–1924
 Erman Bevab – (SVN) – Rudar Velenje 2015–2016
 Darko Bodul – (BIH) – Sarajevo 2021–2022, Igman Konjic 2022–present
 Marko Božić – (SVN) – Radomlje (2021)–2022, Maribor 2022–present
 Christian Bubalović – (SVN) – Rudar Velenje 2012–2014
 Haris Bukva – (CRO) – Hajduk Split 2013–2014
 Marcel Canadi – (CRO) – Šibenik (2022)–2023
 Rudolf Chmelicek – (Yug/CRO) – Slavija Osijek 1936–1937, Građanski Zagreb 1937–1938
 Emir Dilaver – (CRO) – Dinamo Zagreb 2018–2020, 2021–2023, Rijeka 2022–present
 Marco Djuricin – (CRO) – Rijeka 2022–present
 David Domej – (CRO) – Hajduk Split 2014–2016
 Aleksandar Dragović – (SRB) – Red Star Belgrade 2021–present
 Karl Dürschmied – (Yug/SVN) – Athletic SK Celje 1920–1921
 Gabriel Eskinja – (CRO) – Slaven Belupo 2021–present
 Pascal Estrada – (SVN) – Olimpija Ljubljana 2022–present
 Raul Florucz – (CRO) – Lokomotiva Zagreb 2020–present
 Kujtim Gashi – (MNE) – Lovćen Cetinje 2016–2017
 Petrit Gashi – (KOS) – Liria Prizren 2018–2019
 Oskar Gasteiger – (Yug/CRO) – Slavija Osijek 1929–1930
 Petar Gluhaković – (CRO) – Lokomotiva Zagreb 2019–2021
 Alexander Gorgon – (CRO) – Rijeka 2016–2020
 Sandro Gotal – (CRO) – Hajduk Split 2014–2015, Istra 1961 (2017)–2018
 Ferdinand Götz – (Yug/BIH) – SAŠK Sarajevo 1921–1931
 Viktor Götz – (Yug/BIH, CRO) – SAŠK Sarajevo 1922–1923, 1925–1931, Građanski Zagreb 1923–1925
 Lukas Grgić – (CRO) – Hajduk Split 2021–present
 Manuel Haas – (CRO) – Inter Zaprešić 2019–2020
 Adel Halilović – (SVN) – ND Gorica 2018–(2019)
 Osman Hadžikić – (CRO, BIH) – Inter Zaprešić 2019–2020, Velež Mostar 2022–present
 Karl Hammerer – (Yug/BIH) – SAŠK Sarajevo 1930–1931
 Karl Heinlein – (Yug/CRO) – Građanski Zagreb 1918–1922
 Arnel Jakupović – (SVN) – Domžale 2019–2022, Maribor 2022–present
 Rudolf Juzek – (Yug/CRO) – VŠK Varaždin 1923–1924
 Mateo Karamatić – (SVN) – Olimpija Ljubljana 2022–present
 Goran Kartalija – (Yug/SRB) – Vojvodina 1988–1991
 Daniel Kogler – (BIH) – Velež Mostar 2008–2009
 Aleksandar Kostić – (SRB) – Radnički Niš 2018–2019
 Toni Krammer – (Yug/CRO) – Concordia Zagreb 1940–1942
 Robert Lang – (Yug/SRB) – Jugoslavija Belgrade 1920–1921
 Saša Lazić – (SRB) – Rad Belgrade (2017)–2018
 Viktor Löwenfeld – (Yug/CRO) – Concordia Zagreb 1921–1925
 Ivan Lučić – (CRO) – Istra 1961 2020–2023, Hajduk Split 2022–present
 Robert Ljubičić – (CRO) – Dinamo Zagreb 2022–present
 Franz Mantler – (Yug/CRO) – Hajduk Split 1921 Građanski Zagreb 1921–1930
 Dario Marešić – (CRO) – Istra 1961 2022–present
 Manuel Martic – (CRO) – Inter Zaprešić 2019–2020
 Armin Mašović – (SRB) – Novi Pazar 2014–2016
 Damir Mehmedovic – (SVN) – Tabor Sežana 2019–(2020)
 Wilibald Merkus – (Yug/MKD) – Sinđelić Skoplje 1924–192x
 Dino Mušija – (SVN) – Domžale 2019–2020
 Dejan Nešović – (SRB) – Radnik Surdulica 2016–2017
 Alexander Neufeld aka Sándor Nemes – (Yug/SRB) – BSK Belgrade 1932–1933 (both Hungarian and Austrian international)
 Dejan Obućina – (SRB) – Smederevo 2012–2013
 Daniel Offenbacher – (SVN) – Domžale 2022–present
 Miroslav Orlic – (MNE) – OFK Petrovac 2019–(2020)
 Alen Oroz – (BIH) – Široki Brijeg 2008–2009
 Abd Osman Ali – (SVN) – Celje 2015–2016
 Vilim Pammer – (Yug/SVN) – Primorje Ljubljana 1924–1925
 Roman Pany – (Yug/MNE, SRB) – Arsenal Tivat 1936–1937, Jedinstvo Belgrade 1938–1939
 Mario Pavelić – (CRO) – Rijeka 2018–2019
 Markus Pavić – (CRO) – Rudeš 2017–2018, Istra 1961 2019–2020
 Stefan Perić – (CRO) – Šibenik 2021–present
 Stefan Petrović – (SVN) – Zavrč (2015)–2016
 Aleksandar Popović – (SVN, SRB) – Olimpija 2003–2005, Vojvodina 2005–2009
 Dominik Prokop – (CRO) – HNK Gorica 2022–present
 Denis Rizvanović – (BIH) – Velež Mostar (2008)–2009
 Rudolf Rupec – (Yug/CRO) – Građanski Zagreb 1920–1923 (both Austrian and Yugoslav international)
 August Sadek – (Yug/CRO) – Viktorija Zagreb 1924–1925
 Patrick Salomon – (CRO) – Šibenik (2022)–2023
 Milan Sapardic – (BIH) – Borac Banja Luka (2013)–2014
 Miloš Savić – (SVN) – Tabor Sežana (2022)–2023
 Stefan Savić – (CRO, SVN) – Slaven Belupo 2015–2017, Olimpija Ljubljana 2017–2020
 Dardan Shabanhaxhaj – (SVN) – Mura 2022–present
 Srđan Spiridonović – (SRB) – Red Star Belgrade (2020)–2021
 Erik Stibilj – (SVN) – ND Gorica 2003–2005
 Daniel Sudar – (SRB) – Zlatibor Čajetina 2020–(2021)
 Dejan Šarac – (CRO) – Varaždin 2019–(2020)
 Mato Šimunović – (SVN) – Domžale 2009–2011, 2012–2013
 Toni Tipurić – (CRO) – Cibalia Vinkovci 2016–(2017)
 Unterreiter – (Yug/SVN) – Ilirija Ljubljana 1929–1930
 Vigan Veliu – (KOS) – KEK-u Kastriot 2018–2019
 Mario Lovre Vojković – (CRO, SVN) – Rudeš (2018)–2019, Krško 2018–(2019), Istra 1961 2020–2021
 Aleksandar Vucenovic – (BIH) – Željezničar Sarajevo 2021–(2022)
 Stipe Vučur – (CRO) – Hajduk Split 2018–2020
 Željko Vuković – (Yug/CRO) – Dinamo Zagreb 1985–1988, Dinamo Vinkovci 1988–1990, Osijek 1990–1991
 Karl Zankl – (Yug/SVN) – Ilirija Ljubljana 1925–(1926)
 Petar Zivkov – (SRB) – OFK Beograd 2013–(2014)

Azerbaijan
 Mahir Emreli – (CRO) – Dinamo Zagreb 2021–present
 Amit Guluzade – (KOS, BIH) – Drita Gjilan 2017–2018, Čelik Zenica 2018–2019
 Tural Humbatov – (MKD, MNE) – Pobeda Prilep (2017)–2018, Dečić Tuzi 2017–(2018)
 Murad Hüseynov – (SRB) – Sloboda Užice (2013)–2014
 Nazim Mammadzade – (MKD) – Renova 2021–(2022)
 Samir Masimov – (SVN) – Domžale 2015–2016
 Filip Ozobić – (CRO) – Hajduk Split 2011–2013, Slaven Belupo 2013–2016
 Ruslan Qurbanov – (CRO) – Hajduk Split 2014–(2015)
 Branimir Subašić – (SRB) – Železnik Belgrade 1998–2002, Red Star Belgrade 2008–2009, OFK Belgrade 2015–2017
 Elvin Yunuszade – (BIH, MKD) – Čelik Zenica 2019–(2020), Shkupi (2020)–2021

Belarus
 Vitaly Lisakovich – (CRO) – Rudeš 2018–(2019), Varaždin (2019)–2020
 Ilya Lukashevich – (SRB) – Proleter Novi Sad 2019–2020
 Mikhail Markhel – (Yug/MNE) – Budućnost Podgorica 1991–1992
 Ivan Mayewski – (SVN) – Celje 2021–present
 Aliaksandr Metlitskiy – (Yug/CRO) – Osijek 1990–1991
 Aliaksandr Poznyak – (MKD) – Rabotnički Skopje (2021)–2022
 Andrei Shalimo – (Yug/CRO) – Osijek 1990–1991
 Samuilo Suzina – (Yug/SRB) – BSK Belgrade 1924–1925
 Maksim Vitus – (CRO) – RNK Split 2015–2017

Belgium
 Stanley Aborah – (SVN) – Mura 05 (2012)–2013
 James Akugbe Amasihohu – (MKD) – Pobeda Prilep 2022–present
 Abdelhakim Bouhna – (CRO) – Istra 1961 2015–2017
 Naoufal Boumina – (KOS) – Vushtrria 2019–(2020)
 Moutir Chajia – (CRO) – Lokomotiva Zagreb 2020–2021
 Mustapha Kalkan – (SVN) – Celje 2004–2005
 Ibrahim Kargbo Jr. – (SVN) – Celje 2021–(2022), 2022–present
 Faysel Kasmi – (MKD) – Bregalnica Štip (2022)–2023
 Jordan Lomba Mplandi – (MKD) – Rabotnički Skopje 2019–(2020)
 Kéres Masangu – (CRO) – Šibenik 2020–(2021)
 Luca Polizzi – (CRO) – Inter Zaprešić 2016–2017
 Branko Strupar – (CRO) – Dinamo Zagreb 2003–2004
 Emir Umit – (KOS) – Llapi (2019)–2020
 Floriano Vanzo – (SVN) – ND Gorica (2013)–2014
 Saša Varga – (SVN) – Radomlje (2021)–2022
 Julien Vercauteren – (CRO) – RNK Split 2016–(2017)
 Gordan Vidović – (Yug/BIH) – Željezničar Sarajevo 1987–1992
 Josip Weber – (Yug/CRO) – Hajduk Split 1985–1987, Dinamo Vinkovci 1987–1988
 Marten Wilmots – (SVN) – Triglav Kranj 2019–(2020)
 Reno Wilmots – (SVN) – Triglav Kranj 2019–(2020)
 Mikael Yourassowsky – (CRO) – Rijeka 2009–2011
 Franco Zennaro – (CRO) – Istra 1961 2014–2015

Benin
 Shakiru Abikoyé – (MKD) – Pobeda Prilep 2004–(2005)
 Mohamed Aoudou – (CRO) – Istra 1961 (2009)–2010

Bermuda
 Djair Parfitt-Williams – (SVN) – Rudar Velenje 2017–2019

Bolivia
 José Luis Ortíz – (SVN) – Nafta Lendava 2007–2008

Brazil
 Fernando Abreu – (SVN) – Olimpija Ljubljana 2009–2010
 André Adam – (BIH) – Zvijezda Gradačac 2012–2015
 Adeílton – (MKD) – Pelister Bitola 2008–(2009)
 Adilson – (SRB) – Red Star Belgrade 1997–1998
 Adriano Francisco – (MKD) – Bregalnica Štip 2010–2011
 Adriano Strack – (BIH) – Travnik 2013–2015, Novi Pazar (2015)–2016
 Aílton – (SRB) – Red Star Belgrade 2006–2007
 Alexandre – (CRO) – Dinamo Zagreb 2000–2002
 Alexandre Carmo – (BIH) – Široki Brijeg 2008–2009
 Alexandre Leal – (SVN) – Beltinci 1998–1999
 Alexsandro – (MNE) – Rudar Pljevlja 2008–2009
 Alisson – (MKD) – Vardar Skopje 2006–2007
 Alisson Taddei – (BIH) – Široki Brijeg (2022)–2023
 Jean-Pierre Alonso – (MKD) – Cementarnica 55 2003–2004
 Amauri – (CRO) – Međimurje 2009–2010, Šibenik 2010–2011
 Anderson Barbosa – (MKD) – Makedonija GP (2020)–2021, Belasica 2020–(2021)
 Anderson Costa – (SRB) – Rad Belgrade 2002–2003
 Anderson Costa – (CRO) – Dinamo Zagreb 2005–2007
 Anderson Boi Marcelino – (SVN) – Celje 1997–1998
 Anderson Marques – (SRB) – Partizan Belgrade 2011–2012
 Álex dos Santos – (CRO) – Lokomotiva Zagreb (2020)–2021
 André – (CRO) – Osijek 2001–2002, Međimurje 2003–2008, 2008–2011, Lučko (2011)–2012
 André Luiz – (BIH) – Zrinjski Mostar 2003–2004
 André Luiz aka Andrezinho – (CRO) – Rijeka 2007–2008, Osijek 2008–2010
 André Mensalão – (MKD) – Škendija Tetovo 2021–(2022)
 André Penalva – (MKD) – Makedonija GP 2018–2019
 Andrezinho – (SRB) – Borac Čačak 2009–2010
 Andrey – (CRO) – Rudeš 2018–2019
 Andrey Yago – (MKD) – Makedonija GP 2022–present
 Arghus – (SVN) – Maribor 2011–2015
 Jadelson Azul – (MKD) – Pelister Bitola (2017)–2018
 Bady – (CRO) – Istra 1961 2017–2018
 Jonathan Balotelli – (MKD) – Vardar Skopje 2016–2017
 Pedro Beda – (BIH) – Rudar Prijedor 2013–(2014)
 Bianor Neto – (MKD, KOS) – Makedonija GP 2018–2019, Shkupi 2019–2021, Llapi 2021–present
 Aguinaldo Braga – (MKD) – Makedonija GP 1999–2001, Vardar Skopje 2001–2002, 2003–2004, 2005–2009, Teteks Tetovo (2009)–2010, Cementarnica 55 2009–(2010) (Macedonian international)
 Brandao de Souza – (BIH) – Velež Mostar 2017–2022
 Bruno Amaral – (MKD) – FK Skopje 2017–present
 Bruno Arrabal – (KOS) – Llapi (2019)–2020, Arbëria 2020–2021, Drenica (2021)–2022
 Bruno Matos – (SRB) – Novi Pazar 2014–2015, 2015–(2016), Red Star Belgrade (2015)–2016
 Bruno Oliveira – (BIH) – Široki Brijeg 2022–present
 Bruno Paiva – (MNE) – Zeta (2016)–2017
 Bruno Sávio – (CRO) – Istra 1961 2018–2019
 Cadú – (MNE, SRB) – Zeta 2007–2009, Red Star Belgrade 2009–2013
 Jonathan Cafu – (SRB) – Red Star Belgrade 2018–2019
 Caio da Cruz – (CRO) – HNK Gorica 2021–present
 Caio Sanchez – (SRB) – Radnički Niš 2013–2014
 Rodrigo Cardoso – (BIH) – Zvijezda Gradačac 2014–(2015)
 Carlinhos Farias – (MKD) – Makedonija GP (2009)–2010
 Carlos – (CRO) – Rudeš 2018–2019
 Carlos Santos – (CRO) – Dinamo Zagreb 2005–2010, Varteks 2008–(2009), Zagreb 2010–2011
 André Carvalho – (BIH) – Široki Brijeg 2006–2007
 Matheus Cassini – (CRO) – Inter Zaprešić 2015–(2016)
 Cássio – (BIH) – Travnik 2011–2012
 Cássio – (CRO) – Hajduk Split 2012–2013
 Cauê – (SRB, BIH) – OFK Belgrade 2009–2010, Drina Zvornik (2010)–2011
 Célio Junior – (CRO) – Karlovac 2011–2012
 Celson Borges – (BIH) – Široki Brijeg 2005–2008
 César – (CRO) – Osijek 2003–2004
 César Augusto – (BIH) – Sarajevo 2015–(2016)
 Cesinha – (MKD) – Makedonija GP 2008–2009
 Caique Chagas – (BIH, MNE) – Zvijezda 09 2019–2020, Sutjeska Nikšić 2020–2022, OFK Petrovac 2022–present
 Charles – (MKD) – Vardar Skopje (2020)–2021, Makedonija GP 2020–(2021)
 Cícero Lima – (CRO) – Međimurje 2005–2011
 Clarismario – (BIH) – Rudar Prijedor 2021–2022, Željezničar Sarajevo 2022–present
 Claudemir – (SVN) – Primorje 1998–1999
 Claudinho – (CRO) – Zadar 1994–1995
 Clayton – (MKD) – Vardar Skopje 2005–2006
 Cléo – (SRB) – Red Star Belgrade 2008–2009, Partizan Belgrade 2009–2011
 Cleyton – (CRO) – Dinamo Zagreb 2013–(2014)
 Toninho Cortez – (BIH) – Čelik Zenica 2005–2007
 Cristian – (SRB) – Mladost GAT 2022–present
 Curuca – (BIH) – Čelik Zenica 2005–2007
 Daltro – (SVN) – Celje 2007–2008
 Danillo Bala – (MKD) – Vardar Skopje (2018)–2019
 Danilo Goiano – (MNE) – Zeta 2007–2008
 Dario – (MKD) – Makedonija GP 2007–(2008)
 David Lopes – (CRO) – Osijek 2005–2008
 Rodrigo Defendi – (SVN) – Maribor 2015–2017
 Deílson – (MKD) – Vardar Skopje 2004–2007, Pobeda Prilep 2008–2009, Teteks Tetovo 2009–2011
 Denilson – (CRO) – Osijek 2001–2003, Međimurje 2004–2005
 Dénio – (SVN) – Mura 1999–2000
 Denisson Silva – (KOS) – Drenica 2020–2022
 Diego – (BIH) – Žepče 2007–2008
 Diego Leonardo – (BIH) – Široki Brijeg 2003–2004
 Diego Paulista – (BIH) – Široki Brijeg 2006–(2007)
 Diogo – (BIH) – Široki Brijeg 2009–2011, GOŠK Gabela 2011–2012
 Djalma – (MKD) – Vardar Skopje 2006–2007
 Dodo – (BIH) – Široki Brijeg 2003–2004
 Dodô – (CRO) – Inter Zaprešić 2008–2009, Dinamo Zagreb 2009–2010, Lokomotiva Zagreb 2010–2011
 Douglas Cruz – (BIH) – Borac Banja Luka (2020)–2021, Rudar Prijedor (2021)–2022
 Edenilson Bergonsi – (KOS) – Drita Gjilan 2016–2017, 2018–present
 Edgar – (SRB) – Red Star Belgrade 2008–2009
 Edison Amaral – (SRB, SVN) – Radnički Kragujevac 2001–2002, Šmartno ob Paki 2002–2003
 Ednaldo Ribeiro – (MKD) – Cementarnica 55 2005–(2006)
 Edson – (CRO) – Slaven Belupo 2013–2016
 Edson Arantes – (MKD) – Makedonija GP 2000–2001
 Edson Silva – (SRB) – Red Star Belgrade 2015–2016
 Eduardo – (SRB) – Partizan Belgrade 2011–2013
 Eduardo da Silva – (CRO) – Inter Zaprešić 2002–2003, Dinamo Zagreb 2001–2007 (Croatian international)
 Eliomar – (CRO) – Međimurje 2007–2010, Istra 1961 2010–2011
 Eliomar – (SRB, BIH) – Javor Ivanjica 2007–2013, 2015–2018, 2022–present, Partizan Belgrade 2012–(2013), Široki Brijeg 2018–2019, Mladost Lučani 2019–2020, Inđija (2020)–2021, Zlatibor Čajetina 2020–(2021)
 Elisson Baiano – (MKD) – Skopje 2021–2022
 Elton Calé – (KOS) – Gjilani 2021–present
 Ely Thadeu – (SRB) – Red Star Belgrade 2006–2007, Bežanija 2007–2008
 Emerson – (BIH) – Široki Brijeg 2008–2009
 Emerson – (MKD) – Napredok Kičevo 2004–2005
 Emerson – (MKD) – Bregalnica Štip 2003–2004, Pobeda Prilep 2004–2006
 Emerson Brito – (SRB) – Javor Ivanjica 2022–present
 Emerson Deocleciano – (CRO) – Lokomotiva Zagreb 2019–2021
 Emerson Luiz – (BIH) – Sarajevo 2015–2016
 Endelson – (SRB) – Sartid Smederevo 1997–1998
 João Erick – (CRO) – Rudeš 2018–2019
 Ericsson – (MKD) – Vardar Skopje 2007–2008
 Etto – (CRO) – Dinamo Zagreb 2005–2011
 Evandro da Silva – (SRB) –  Proleter Novi Sad (2021)–2022, Radnički Kragujevac 2022–present
 Evandro Goebel – (SRB) – Red Star Belgrade 2010–2012
 Everton – (MKD) – Cementarnica 55 2003–2004
 Everton Luiz – (SRB) – Partizan Belgrade 2015–2018
 Fabinho Mauá – (SRB) – OFK Belgrade 2003–(2004)
 Fábio – (CRO, MKD) – Varteks (2007)–2008, Vardar Skopje 2007–(2008), 2010–(2011), Rabotnički Skopje 2008–2011
 Fábio Silva – (SRB) – Rad Belgrade 2002–2005, 2006–(2007), Red Star Belgrade (2005)–2006, Hajduk Kula 2005–(2006), Napredak Kruševac (2007)–2008
 Fabrício – (SRB) – Partizan Belgrade (2015)–2016
 Richard Falcão – (SRB) – Novi Pazar 2014–2015
 Felipe – (BIH) – Posušje 2006–(2007)
 Felipe – (CRO) – Hajduk Split 2006–(2007)
 Felipe Ferreira – (SRB) – Javor Ivanjica 2015–(2016)
 Felipe Menegon – (MKD) – Makedonija GP (2009)–2010
 Felipe Montanari – (MKD) – Makedonija GP (2009)–2010
 Felipe Paulista – (MKD) – Makedonija GP 2018–2019
 Felipe Pires – (CRO) – Rijeka 2019–(2020)
 Felipe Santos – (SVN) – Ankaran Hrvatini 2017–(2018), Maribor 2018–2021
 Alef Firmino – (KOS) – Llapi 2021–present
 Luiz Fernando – (CRO) – Rijeka 2000–2001
 Fernando Alcântara – (MKD) – Rabotnički Skopje 2009–2011
 Fernando Augusto – (MKD, KOS) – Pelister Bitola 2016–2017, Makedonija GP 2019–2022, Llapi 2022–present
 Fernando Silva – (MKD) – Pelister Bitola 2016–2017, Renova 2017–2018, Borec Veles 2019–2021
 Josiesley Ferreira – (SRB) – Red Star Belgrade 2008–2009
 Flamarion – (MNE) – Lovćen Cetinje (2016)–2017
 Flávio Beck – (BIH, SVN, MNE) – Široki Brijeg 2008–(2009), Maribor 2009–(2010), Budućnost Podgorica 2011–2013, 2014–2015, Lovćen Cetinje 2015–2016, OFK Petrovac (2021)–2022
 Henrique Maciel Flavio – (MKD) – Tikveš 2000–2001
 Leid França – (MNE) – Jedinstvo Bijelo Polje 2005–2007
 Franco – (MKD) – Pobeda Prilep 2008–(2009)
 Franklin – (CRO) – Lokomotiva Zagreb 2018–(2019)
 Franklin Vicente – (SVN) – ND Gorica 2010–2012, Olimpija Ljubljana 2012–2013, 2013–(2014), Celje (2013)–2014
 Domingo Franulovic – (Yug/CRO) – RNK Split 1956–1965
 Matheus Freitas – (KOS) – Hajvalia 2015–2017
 Fumaça – (SRB) – Red Star Belgrade 1998–1999
 Fumaça (Alessandro Pedro Ribeiro) – (CRO) – Croatia Sesvete 2006–2009
 Gabriel – (CRO, SVN) – Šibenik 2006–2008, Drava Ptuj (2008)–2009, Primorje 2008–(2009), Olimpija Ljubljana 2009–2010, Maribor 2010–2011, Nafta Lendava 2011–2012
 Gabriel – (CRO) – Dinamo Zagreb 2017–2018
 Gefferson Goulart – (SRB) – Železnik Belgrade 2003–2005
 Germano – (BIH) – Jedinstvo Bihać 2003–(2004)
 Gil Xavier – (BIH) – Zrinjski Mostar 2003–2005
 Gilberto Fortunato – (KOS) – Drita Gjilan (2016)–2017, (2019)–2020
 Gilson – (MKD) – Pobeda Prilep 2001–2002, 2004–2005, 2007–2008 (Macedonian international)
 Giuliano Marinho – (MNE) – Budućnost Podgorica 2008–2009
 Aranha Pinheiro Glauver – (BIH, CRO) – Posušje 2004–2005, Inter Zaprešić 2007–2008
 Godoy – (BIH, SRB) – Modriča (2007)–2008, Laktaši (2008)–2009, Banat Zrenjanin 2008–(2009)
 Guiba – (SRB) – Red Star Belgrade 1997–1998
 Gustavo Carbonieri – (CRO, KOS) – Hajduk Split 2017–2018, Trepça '89 2020–(2021)
 Guti – (CRO) – Osijek 2018–2021
 Héber – (CRO) – Slaven Belupo 2016–2017, Rijeka 2017–2019
 Helbert – (MKD) – Baškimi Kumanovo 2004–2005
 Helder – (CRO) – Slaven Belupo (2016)–2017
 Higo – (SVN) – Koper 2006–2007
 Hugo Souza – (BIH) – Široki Brijeg 2013–2014, Olimpic Sarajevo 2014–2016
 Iago – (KOS) – Trepça´89 2016–present
 Ian Augusto – (KOS) – Vushtrria (2019)–2020
 Igor – (MKD) – Škendija Tetovo 2020–present
 Igor Silva – (CRO) – Osijek 2019–2021
 Iran Junior – (KOS) –  Ulpiana 2021–2022, Drita Gjilan 2022–present
 Irapuan França – (MKD) – Vardar Skopje 2007–2008
 Ivan – (MKD) – Baškimi Kumanovo 2004–(2005)
 Ivan Paulista – (CRO) – Šibenik 2002–2003, Međimurje 2004–2005
 Izaldo – (MKD) – Makedonija GP 2018–2019
 Jackson – (KOS) – Gjilani 2019–2021
 Jair Souto – (BIH, MNE) – Leotar Trebinje 2008–2010, 2011–2012, OFK Grbalj (2010)–2011
 Jairo – (CRO) – Hajduk Split 2018–present
 Jairon – (BIH) – Posušje 2005–2006
 James Dens – (CRO) – Zagreb 2010–2011, Hajduk Split 2011–2012
 Jander – (SRB) – Red Star Belgrade (2019)–2020
 Carlos Roberto Jatobá – (Yug/SRB) – Spartak Subotica 1990–1991
 Jayme – (MKD) – Teteks Tetovo (2014)–2015
 Jean Carioca – (KOS) – Feronikeli 2018–2021, Dukagjini 2021–2022
 Jean Carioca – (SRB) – OFK Belgrade 2002–(2003)
 Jeff Silva – (SRB) – Red Star Belgrade 2008–2009
 Jefferson – (MKD) – Napredok Kičevo 1999–2000, Škendija Tetovo (2000)–2001, Makedonija GP 2000–(2001), Osogovo 2001–2002, Cementarnica 55 2004–2005
 Jefferson – (KOS) – Gjilani 2018–2019
 Jefferson – (KOS) – Prishtina 2017–(2018)
 Jefferson Batista – (SRB) – Vojvodina 2008–2009
 Jefferson Fernandes – (SVN) – Primorje 1998–1999
 Jefferson Santos – (CRO) – Hajduk Split 2015–2017
 Jefthon – (BIH, CRO, SVN) – Posušje 2002–2004, 2007–2008, Zagreb 2009–2011, Široki Brijeg 2011–2012, Inter Zaprešić 2014–2015, Koper 2015–2016
 Jerferson de Lima – (MKD) – Makedonija GP 2018–2019
 Jhonnes – (SVN, CRO) – Domžale 2004–2006, Celje 2006–(2007), Varaždin (2011)–2012
 Jildemar – (MNE) – Sutjeska Nikšić (2016)–2017
 Jô – (CRO) – Istra 1961 2013–2014, 2014–2015, Hajduk Split (2014)–2015
 João Paulo – (MNE) – Rudar Pljevlja 2008–2009
 João Paulo – (SRB) – Smederevo (2012)–2013
 Jonas – (CRO) – Dinamo Zagreb (2016)–2017
 Juan Felipe – (MKD) – Vardar Skopje 2015–2018, 2018–(2019), Škendija Tetovo (2019)–2020
 Juca – (SRB) – Partizan Belgrade 2007–2009
 Victor Juffo – (MKD, SVN) – Škendija Tetovo 2014–2017, Vardar Skopje 2018–2019, Koper 2020–2021, Pelister Bitola (2021)–2022
 Júlio – (MNE) – Rudar Pljevlja 2008–2009
 Juninho – (MKD) – Pelister Bitola 2008–(2009)
 Juninho – (SVN) – Domžale 2004–2008, 2009–2011, 2015–2017
 Juninho – (BIH) – Sarajevo (2010)–2011
 Juninho – (SVN) – ND Gorica 2014–2015
 Juninho – (MKD) – Makedonija GP (2018)–2019, Vardar Skopje 2019–2020
 Juninho Cabral – (MKD) – Rabotnički Skopje 2019–present
 Júnior – (MKD) – Pelister Bitola 2007–2009
 Kadu – (BIH) – Široki Brijeg 2022–present
 Klebert – (MNE) – Rudar Pljevlja 2008–2009
 Leandro Montebeler – (SRB) – Vojvodina 2008–2009, Napredak Kruševac 2009–2010
 Leandro Netto – (SRB) – OFK Belgrade 2001–2004
 Leandro Pinto – (SRB) – Proleter Novi Sad 2018–2021, TSC Bačka Topola 2021–2022, Radnik Surdulica (2022)–2023
 Matheus Lemos Da Silva – (MKD) – Makedonija GP 2022–present
 Léo Bonfin – (SVN) – Olimpija Ljubljana 2009–2010
 Léo Freitas – (KOS) – Vushtrria 2019–2020
 Leomar – (MKD) – Pelister Bitola 2008–2009
 Leonardo – (SRB) – Partizan Belgrade 2016–2017
 Lico – (MKD) – Vardar Skopje 2011–2012
 Fabricio Lima – (BIH) – Posušje 2007–2009
 Vitor Lima – (MKD) – Tikveš 2000–2001
 Júnior Lopes – (BIH) – Čelik Zenica 2008–(2009)
 Lorran – (CRO) – Istra 1961 2014–2015
 Lucao – (MKD) – Makedonija GP 2016–2017, Renova 2017–2018
 Lucas – (SVN) – Domžale 2004–(2005)
 Lucas – (SRB) – Smederevo (2012)–2013
 Lucas Cardoso – (MKD, KOS) – Pelister Bitola 2016–2018, Drita Gjilan (2019)–2020, Ballkani (2022)–2023
 Lucas Gomes – (MNE) – OFK Titograd (2019)–2020
 Lucas Jr. – (MKD, BIH) – Pobeda Prilep 2017–2018, Zvijezda 09 2019–2020
 Lucas Medeiros – (MNE) – Dečić Tuzi 2016–(2017)
 Lucas Piasentin – (SRB) – Čukarički Belgrade 2013–2017
 Luciano – (BIH) – Široki Brijeg 2009–2010
 Luiz aka Fala Mansa – (MKD) – Vardar Skopje 2006–2007
 Murilo Maccari – (SVN) – Domžale 2006–2007
 Maicon – (CRO) – Istra 1961 2018–(2019)
 Mailson – (BIH) – Željezničar Sarajevo 2015–2016
 Maranhão – (KOS) – Drenica 2022–present
 Marcelo – (MNE) – Zeta 2007–2008
 Marciano – (BIH) – Čelik Zenica 2005–2006, Sarajevo 2006–2007, Široki Brijeg 2007–2009, 2010–2012
 Marcinho Pitbull – (MKD) – Teteks Tetovo (2014)–2015
 Márcio Bambú – (MKD) – Rabotnički Skopje 2009–2011
 Márcio Fernandes – (BIH) – Široki Brijeg 2008–(2009)
 Marclei Santos – (KOS) – Feronikeli (2020)–2021, Arbëria 2020–(2021), Ulpiana 2021–2022, Prishtina (2022)–2023, Dukagjini 2022–present
 Marcos – (SRB) – OFK Belgrade 2003–2004
 Marcos Alexandre – (MKD) – Rabotnički Skopje 2004–2005
 Marcos Guilherme – (CRO) – Dinamo Zagreb 2016–2017
 Mário Lúcio – (CRO) – Istra 1961 2016–2017
 Mariotto – (SVN) – Olimpija Ljubljana (2015)–2016
 Marquinhos – (Yug/SRB) – Spartak Subotica 1990–1991
 Breno Matos – (KOS) – Besa Pejë 2020–present
 Mateus – (SRB, CRO) – Borac Čačak 2017–2018, Slaven Belupo 2018–2020
 Matheus de Paula – (KOS) – Vushtrria (2019)–2020, Besa Pejë 2020–present
 Lucas Sebastian Marques Da Silva – (KOS) – Besa Pejë 2020–present
 Mauricio – (KOS) – Gjilani 2018–present
 Bruno Mezenga – (SRB) – Red Star Belgrade (2011)–2012
 Michel Costa – (BIH) – Široki Brijeg 2007–(2008)
 Adriano Miranda – (MKD) – Pelister Bitola 2007–2009
 Marcos Miranda – (CRO) – Istra 1961 2014–2015
 Moisés – (CRO) – Rijeka 2013–2016
 Osvaldo Monteiro – (Yug/SRB) – Spartak Subotica 1990–1991
 Lucas Moura – (CRO) – Istra 1961 (2021)–2022
 Nandinho – (MKD) – Teteks Tetovo (2014)–2015
 Nathan – (BIH) – Sarajevo 2018–2020, Olimpik Sarajevo 2020–2021
 Nenê – (MKD) – Vardar Skopje 2000–2001
 Neno – (MKD) – Rabotnički Skopje 2005–2007, Metalurg Skopje 2008–2010, Vardar Skopje 2010–2011, Bregalnica Štip 2011–2012
 Diego Neres – (MKD) – Bregalnica Štip (2016)–2017, Pelister Bitola 2017–(2018)
 Nelson Neto – (KOS) – Llapi 2004–2005
 Gabriel Neves – (SRB) – BSK Borča 2012–2013
 Carlos Oliveira – (BIH) – Široki Brijeg 2004–(2005)
 Erick Oliveira – (CRO, BIH) – Hajduk Split 2003–2004, Posušje 2004–2006, Široki Brijeg 2004–(2005)
 Renan Oliveira – (BIH) – Sarajevo 2022–present
 Rogério Oliveira – (MKD) – Pobeda Prilep 1997–1999, Rabotnički Skopje 2000–2002, Vardar Skopje 2002–2006, Škendija Tetovo 2006–2007
 Sérgio Oliveira – (CRO) – Rijeka 1999–2000, Hrvatski Dragovoljac 2008–2011
 Talys – (CRO) – Osijek 2019–2022, Slaven Belupo 2022–present
 Osmar – (CRO) – Inter Zaprešić 2007–2008
 Pablo Pires – (MNE) – Rudar Pljevlja 2016–(2017)
 Vinícius Pacheco – (SRB) – Red Star Belgrade 2011–2012
 Padú – (MKD) – Makedonija GP 2018–2020
 Lucas Patinho – (CRO) – Hajduk Split 2012–2013
 Patrick – (MNE) – Rudar Pljevlja 2018–2019
 Paulinho – (SVN) – Celje 1998–1999
 Paulino – (MKD) – Vardar Skopje 2000–2001
 Pedrinho – (MNE) – OFK Grbalj 2018–(2019)
 Picon – (SRB) – OFK Belgrade 2002–(2003)
 Marcelo Pletsch – (SRB) – Vojvodina 2009–2010
 Lucas Precheski – (MNE) – Zeta 2008–2009
 Radaelli – (CRO) – Međimurje 2007–2008
 Rafael – (BIH) – Posušje (2004)–2005, Široki Brijeg 2004–(2005)
 Rafael Batista – (CRO) – Cibalia Vinkovci 2006–2007
 Rafael Carioca – (SRB) – Banat Zrenjanin 2008–2010
 Rafael Goes – (MKD) – Rabotnički Skopje 2021–2022
 Rafael Lopes – (BIH) – Široki Brijeg 2006–(2007)
 Rafael Paraíba – (CRO) – Hajduk Split (2009)–2010
 Uémerson Ramón – (MKD) – Pobeda Prilep 2016–2017
 Carlinho Rech – (MKD) – Škendija Tetovo 2015–2016
 Reginaldo Traves – (CRO) – Slaven Belupo 2002–2003
 Renan – (SRB) – Smederevo 2009–2010
 Renan – (SRB) – Vojvodina (2017)–2018
 Renato – (BIH, CRO) – Široki Brijeg 2004–2006, 2009–2011, Inter Zaprešić (2007)–2008
 Renato – (SVN) – Rudar Velenje 2008–2011
 Ricardinho – (SRB) – Sloboda Užice 2010–(2011)
 Ricardinho – (SRB) – Red Star Belgrade (2017)–2018
 Ricardo Baiano – (BIH) – Široki Brijeg 2002–2004, 2011–2013 (Bosnian international)
 Ricardo da Costa – (BIH, CRO) – Zrinjski Mostar 2003–2005, Hajduk Split 2004–(2005), Međimurje 2005–2007, Široki Brijeg 2007–2009
 Ricardo Rezende – (MKD) – Cementarnica 55 2002–2003
 Richard – (SRB) – Čukarički Belgrade 2022–present
 Rivan – (SRB) – Rad Belgrade 2001–2003, Hajduk Belgrade 2002–(2003)
 Carlos Roberto – (MKD) – Vardar Skopje 2007–2008, 2010–2011, Rabotnički Skopje 2008–2010
 Robinho – (CRO) – Međimurje 2006–2007
 Robson da Silva – (MKD, KOS) – Makedonija GP 2018–2020, 2020–(2021), Belasica (2020)–2021, Llapi (2022)–2023
 Rodrigo – (MKD) – Vardar Skopje 2005–2006
 Rodrigo Almeida – (MKD) – Pobeda Prilep (2007)–2008
 Tiago Rodrigues – (MKD) – Vardar Skopje 2006–2007, Cementarnica 55 2007–2008, Pobeda Prilep 2008–2009, Teteks Tetovo 2009–2011
 Tiago Rodrigues – (BIH) – Široki Brijeg (2009)–2010
 César Romero – (SVN) – ND Gorica 2007–2008
 Ronaldo Viana – (SRB) – Železnik Belgrade 2003–2005
 Roni – (BIH, CRO) – Posušje (2004)–2005, Zagreb 2004–(2005), Široki Brijeg 2005–2009
 Rosinaldo – (SVN) – Olimpija 1993–1994
 Rudison – (SRB) – OFK Belgrade 2000–2003
 Sammir – (CRO) – Dinamo Zagreb 2007–2014, 2016–2017, Lokomotiva Zagreb 2019–2021 (Croatian international)
 Santos Baiano – (BIH) – Zrinjski Mostar 2003–2004
 Pedro Sass – (SRB, MNE) – Borac Čačak 2015–(2016), Dečić Tuzi 2022–present
 Queven – (MKD) – Shkupi 2021–present
 Sávio – (MNE, SRB) – Zeta 2007–2009, Red Star Belgrade 2009–2011, (2011)–2012
 Sávio Oliveira – (MNE) – Arsenal Tivat (2022)–2023
 Janiro Schneider – (SVN) – ND Gorica 2000–2001
 Marlon Schwantes – (SVN) – Celje 2007–2008
 Serginho – (KOS, MKD) – Hajvalia 2015–2016, Rabotnički Skopje 2017–2018, Shkupi 2018–2019
 Sérgio – (MKD) – Vardar Skopje 2005–2006
 Jorge Vinicius Silva – (MKD, BIH) – Baškimi Kumanovo 2004–2006, Željezničar Sarajevo (2006)–2007
 Leandro Silva – (KOS) – Llapi 2003–2005
 Raúl Simplício – (SRB) – Sartid Smederevo 1997–1998
 Igo Soares – (BIH) – Široki Brijeg 2008–2009
 Somália – (SVN) – Celje 1997–1998
 Stefano Spinelli – (SVN) – Koper 2011–2012
 Stefan – (BIH) – Olimpik Sarajevo 2014–2016
 Stênio Júnior – (MKD) – Pelister Bitola (2013)–2014, Škendija Tetovo 2013–2020
 Tai aka Taianan Welker – (SRB) – Napredak Kruševac (2014)–2015, Široki Brijeg 2014–(2015)
 Taigo – (SRB) – Dinamo Vranje 2018–2019
 Marcos Tavares – (SVN) – Maribor 2007–2022
 Marcio Teruel – (SRB) – Jagodina 2012–2013
 Thiago Carioca – (BIH) – Olimpik Sarajevo 2009–2011
 Thiago Roberto – (BIH) – Olimpik Sarajevo (2010)–2011
 Thiaguinho – (CRO) – Hajduk Split (2009)–2010
 Thulio – (MKD) – Shkupi (2019)–2020
 Tiago – (SRB) – Banat Zrenjanin 2007–2008
 Tiago Galvão – (SRB) – Sloboda Užice 2010–2014, Čukarički Belgrade 2015–2016, Borac Čačak 2016–2017
 Paulo Tiago – (MNE) – Rudar Pljevlja 2008–2009
 Tiago Faria – (BIH, CRO, MNE) – Željezničar Sarajevo 2015–2016, Cibalia Vinkovci (2016)–2017, Rudar Pljevlja 2019–2020
 Tom – (SVN) – Koper 2012–2013
 Tony – (MKD) – Sileks Kratovo 2017–2018
 Uirá Marques – (BIH) – Velež Mostar 2018–2020
 Vagner Cruz – (BIH) – Široki Brijeg (2008)–2009
 Vagner Gonçalves – (MKD) – Škendija Tetovo (2022)–2023
 Valdivino – (MKD) – Bregalnica Štip 2003–2004
 Valmir – (MKD) – Metalurg Skopje 2009–2010
 Ronaldo Vanin – (SVN) – ND Gorica 2013–2015
 Vicente – (SVN) – ND Gorica 2013–2014
 Victor Golas – (KOS) – Trepça '89 2018–present
 Victor Lindemberg – (KOS) – Dukagjini 2021–(2022)
 Victor da Silva – (CRO) – Istra 1961 2015–2016
 Diego Vidal – (MKD) – Bregalnica Delčevo 2003–2004
 Vilson Silvano – (MKD) – Vardar Skopje 2004–2005
 Vítor Hugo – (SRB) – Partizan Belgrade 2007–2008
 Vítor Hugo – (KOS) – Dukagjini 2021–present
 Vitor Júnior – (CRO, SVN) – Dinamo Zagreb 2005–2007, Koper (2006)–2007
 Mateus Viveiros – (SRB) – Red Star Belgrade 2016–2017
 Wagner Lago – (BIH) – Posušje 2003–2005, Široki Brijeg 2005–2018
 Wallace – (CRO, BIH) – HNK Gorica (2022)–2023, Velež Mostar 2022–present
 Wallace Lucas – (CRO) – Rudeš 2018–2019
 Walter Ventura – (KOS) – Trepça '89 (2019)–2020
 Wander Machado aka Formiga – (MKD) – Pelister Bitola 2007–2008
 Wandeir – (MKD) – Cementarnica 55 2002–2004, Vardar Skopje 2003–2005, 2006–2007, 2010–(2011), Rabotnički Skopje 2009–2011
 Washington – (MKD, SRB) – Makedonija GP (2008)–2009, Partizan Belgrade 2008–2010, Borac Čačak 2010–2011
 Wederson – (MKD) – Sileks Kratovo 2003–2005
 Wellington Camargo aka Tom – (SRB) – Rad Belgrade 2013–2014
 William – (SRB) – OFK Belgrade 2007–2009
 William Alves – (SRB) – Borac Čačak 2008–2013
 Willian Dias – (MNE) – Iskra Danilovgrad 2021–2022
 Willian Lira – (MKD) – Vardar Skopje 2018–2019
 Willians – (SRB) – Red Star Belgrade 1998–1999
 Yaggo Gomes – (MKD) – Rabotnički Skopje (2019)–2020
 Ygor – (KOS) – Vushtrria (2019)–2020
 Ytalo – (MKD) – Vardar Skopje (2017)–2018
 Zé Carlos – (MKD) – Vardar Skopje 2006–2008, 2010–(2011), Cementarnica 55 2007–(2008), Rabotnički Skopje 2008–2011
 Zé Luis Boscolo – (SRB) – Sartid Smederevo 1997–1998
 Zé Marcos – (SRB, MNE) – Red Star Belgrade 2017–2019, Rad Belgrade 2017–2018, OFK Grbalj 2018–2019

Brunei
 Arsen Marjan – (SRB, MNE) – Zvezdara Belgrade 1998–1999, 2001–2002, Železnik Belgrade (2003)–2004, Radnički Belgrade 2004–2005, Zeta (2005)–2006

Bulgaria
 Angel Angelov – (MKD) – Sasa 2000–2001
 Ivaylo Asparuhov – (SVN) – Primorje 2000–2001
 Todor Atanaskov – (Yug/MKD, SRB) – Građanski Skoplje 1938–1940, Red Star Belgrade 1946–1948 (Svetozar "Todor" Atanacković)
 Andrey Atanasov – (MNE) – Rudar Pljevlja (2014)–2015
 Borislav Baldzhiyski – (MKD) – Makedonija GP 2021–present
 Ivan Bandalovski – (SRB) – Partizan Belgrade 2014–2016
 Stoyan Bogoev – (Yug/MKD) – Građanski Skoplje 1938–1939
 Valeri Bojinov – (SRB, CRO) – Partizan Belgrade 2015–2017, Rijeka 2017–(2018)
 Kristian Dimitrov – (CRO) – Hajduk Split 2019–2023
 Yuli Dimitrov – (MKD) – Sasa 2000–2001
 Kiril Dinchev – (MKD) – Pelister Bitola 2013–2015
 Grigor Dolapchiev – (MKD) – Horizont Turnovo (2014)–2015
 Nikolay Dyulgerov – (MKD) – Rabotnički Skopje 2018–2019
 Kostadin Gadzhalov – (SRB) – Borac Čačak 2010–(2011)
 Kostadin Garganchev – (MKD) – Sasa 2000–2001
 Martin Gaziev – (MKD) – Rabotnički Skopje 2011–(2012)
 Asen Georgiev – (CRO) – Istra 1961 (2016)–2017
 Blagoy Georgiev – (SRB) – Red Star Belgrade 2006–2007
 Kiril Georgiev – (MKD) – Pelister Bitola (2013)–2014
 Trifun Georgiev – (MKD) – Sasa 2000–2001
 Stanimir Gospodinov – (SVN) – Mura 2004–2005
 Angel Granchov – (KOS, MKD) – Flamurtari Prishtina 2018–2020, Akademija Pandev 2019–(2020)
 Lubomir Gutsev – (KOS) – Flamurtari Prishtina 2019–(2020)
 Ivo Harizanov – (MKD) – Horizont Turnovo (2014)–2015
 Nikolay Hristov – (MKD) – Pelister Bitola 2013–2014, Bregalnica Štip 2014–2016, Tikvesh 2021–present
 Ventsislav Hristov – (CRO) – Rijeka 2014–2015
 Dimitar Iliev – (MKD) – Pelister Bitola 2016–2018
 Georgi Ivanov – (CRO) – Rijeka 2006–2008
 Ivan Ivanov – (SRB) – Partizan Belgrade 2011–2013
 Vasil Ivanov – (KOS) – Trepça´89 2006–(2007)
 Zoran Janković – (SRB) – Železnik Belgrade 1996–1998, Vojvodina 1998–2000, Inđija 2008–2011
 Georgi Kakalov – (MKD) – Horizont Turnovo 2013–2014
 Rosen Kaptiev – (MKD) – Vardar Skopje 2005–(2006)
 Martin Kavdanski – (MKD) – Škendija Tetovo (2014)–2015
 Mario Kirev – (KOS) – Drita Gjilan 2018–(2019)
 Dilyan Kolev – (MNE) – Čelik Nikšić 2012–2013, Mladost Podgorica 2013–2014
 Tomi Kostadinov – (MKD) – Bregalnica Štip 2016–(2017)
 Martin Kovachev – (MKD) – Pelister Bitola 2013–2014, 2016–2018, Makedonija GP 2019–2021
 Anton Kuzmanov – (Yug/SRB) – Jedinstvo Belgrade 1939–1941
 Lubomir Lubenov – (MKD) – Pelister Bitola 2013–2014
 Angel Lyaskov – (SVN) – Olimpija Ljubljana (2020)–2021
 Dimitar Makriev – (SVN) – Maribor 2006–2008
 Angel Manolov – (SRB) – Hajduk Kula 2009–2012
 Nasko Milev – (MKD) – Škendija Tetovo 2022–present
 Yordan Miliev – (MKD) – Škendija Tetovo 2013–2015
 Ivan Minchev – (MKD) – Bregalnica Štip 2021–present
 Radko Mutafchiyski – (MKD) – Horizont Turnovo 2013–2015
 Yuliyan Nenov – (MNE) – Sutjeska Nikšić (2022)–2023
 Asen Nikolov – (SRB) – Partizan Belgrade 2006–2007
 Predrag Pažin – (MNE, SRB) – Sutjeska Nikšić 1991–1993, Partizan Belgrade 1994–1999
 Daniel Peev – (CRO) – Osijek 2014–2015
 Mario Petkov – (MKD) – Vardar Skopje 2001–2004
 Petar Petrov – (MKD) – Rabotnički Skopje 2013–2014
 Radanov – (Yug/SRB) – Mitić Belgrade 1942–1943
 Petar Shopov – (SRB, SVN) – Železnik Belgrade 2001–2004, Mura 2004–2005
 Vasil Shopov – (MKD) – Bregalnica Štip (2013)–2014
 Svilen Shterev – (MKD) – Sileks Kratovo 2020–(2021)
 Blagoy Simeonov – (Yug/MKD, SRB) – Građanski Skoplje 1938–1940, OFK Belgrade 1946–1947 (Blagoje Simonović)
 Dragoljub Simonović – (SRB) – Obilić Belgrade 1991–1998
 Kiril Simonovski – (Yug/MKD, SRB) – Građanski Skoplje 1938–1941, Partizan Belgrade 1945–1950 (both Bulgarian and Yugoslav international)
 Yanaki Smirnov – (SRB) – Metalac G.M. 2016–(2017)
 Ilie Krasimir Stoev – (KOS) – Trepça´89 2006–2011
 Borislav Stoyanov – (MKD) – Bregalnica Štip 2012–2013
 Bozhidar Stoychev – (MKD) – Rabotnički Skopje 2013–2014
 Georgi Terziev – (CRO) – Hajduk Split 2016–2017
 Metodi Tomanov – (Yug/SRB) – Radnički Niš 1990–1992
 Igor Tomašić – (CRO) – Dinamo Zagreb 1995–1997
 Borislav Tsonev – (CRO) – Inter Zaprešić 2019–2020
 Kiril Vasilev – (MKD) – Makedonija GP (2000)–2001
 Milen Vasilev – (MKD) – Pelister Bitola (2016)–2017
 Bogdan Vidov – (Yug/MKD) – Građanski Skoplje 1939–1940
 Lyubomir Vitanov – (MKD) – Tikveš 2003–2004
 Emil Viyachki – (MKD) – Rabotnički Skopje 2018–2019
 Dimitar Vodenicharov – (MKD) – Pelister Bitola 2013–2014
 Iliyan Yordanov – (SRB) – Borac Čačak 2015–(2016)

Burkina Faso
 Hassane Bandé – (CRO) – Istra 1961 2020–2022
 Yves Bationo – (SVN) – ND Gorica 2013–2014
 Yannick Dao – (MKD) – Rabotnički Skopje 2019–2020
 Cyrille Kpan – (BIH) – Široki Brijeg 2022–present
 Dramane Salou – (SRB) – Partizan Belgrade 2017–2018
 Bakary Saré – (CRO) – Dinamo Zagreb (2013)–2014
 Patrice Zoungrana – (CRO) – Hajduk Split 2013–2014, Hrvatski Dragovoljac 2021–(2022)

Cameroon
 Mohamadolu Abdouraman – (MKD) – Renova 2005–2006
 Mengbwa Hyacinthe Akamba – (MKD) – Renova 2005–(2006)
 Sylvester Ambe Numfor – (KOS) – Trepça´89 2006–2013
 Steve Ndi Amougou – (MKD) – Renova 2005–(2006)
 Barga Ngoba Anael – (MKD) – Tikvesh 2021–present
 Laurent Atangana – (CRO) – Croatia Sesvete 2008–2009
 Macky Bagnack – (SVN, SRB) – Olimpija Ljubljana 2018–2020, Partizan Belgrade 2020–2021
 Regis Baha – (SRB) – Napredak Kruševac 2018–2020, Mladost Lučani 2020–present
 Michel Nack Balokog – (SVN) – Domžale 2011–2013
 Henri Belle – (CRO) – Istra 1961 2010–2012, RNK Split 2012–2015
 Yves Belle-Belle – (CRO) – Rijeka 1995–1996
 Jean-Claude Billong – (SVN) – Rudar Velenje 2016–2017, Maribor (2017)–2018
 Arouna Dang Bissene – (SVN) – Krka 2013–2014
 Clarence Bitang – (MKD) – Vardar Skopje 2017–2019
 Jean Marc Bogmis – (BIH) – Đerzelez Zenica 1999–2001
 Rodrigue Bongongui – (CRO, SVN) – Slaven Belupo 2018–2019, Tabor Sežana 2019–2020, 2021–2022
 Fabrice Boudega – (KOS) – Ballkani (2019)–2020, Ulpiana (2021)–2022
 Pierre Boya – (SRB) – Partizan Belgrade 2003–2007, (2010)–2011
 Mathias Chago – (CRO) – Dinamo Zagreb 2005–2009, 2010–2012, Istra 1961 2009–(2010), Lokomotiva Zagreb 2012–2014, 2017–2018
 Cedrick Deumaga – (CRO) – Hrvatski Dragovoljac 2008–2009
 Eric Djemba-Djemba – (SRB) – Partizan Belgrade (2013)–2014
 Nestor Djengoue – (CRO) – Zagreb 2012–2013
 Lazare Effa – (KOS) – Ballkani 2019–present
 Thierry Ekwalla – (SRB) – Čukarički Belgrade 2004–2005
 Solomon Enow – (SVN) – ND Gorica 2013–2015
 Gabriel Junior Etémé – (SVN) – Olimpija Ljubljana 2013–2014
 Elong Ngono Etienne – (KOS) – Drenica 2021–present
 David Eto'o – (SVN) – Koper 2010–(2011)
 Thierry Etongou – (SRB) – Radnički Niš 2022–present
 Franck Etoundi – (CRO) – Slaven Belupo 2019–2021
 Fokim Fon Fondo – (SRB) – BSK Borča 2012–2013
 Joseph Fotso – (BIH) – Brotnjo Čitluk 2003–2004
 Ferdinand Fru Fon – (SRB) – Dinamo Vranje 2018–2019
 Marcelin Gando – (MKD) – Rabotnički Skopje 2022–present
 Jessie Guera Djou – (CRO, MKD) – Varaždin 2019–2021, Škendija Tetovo 2021–2022
 Mohammadou Idrissou – (MKD) – Škendija Tetovo 2014–(2015)
 Patrick Kamgaing – (SRB) – Javor Ivanjica 2012–2013
 Daniel Kamy – (MNE, SVN, SRB) – Dečić Tuzi 2016–2017, Olimpija Ljubljana 2019–2021, Inđija 2020–(2021)
 Dinnyuy Kongnyuy – (SVN) – Domžale 2008, Celje 2009, Triglav Kranj 2012–2014
 Patrice Kwedi – (CRO) – Dinamo Zagreb 2001–2002, Inter Zaprešić 2002–2003, (2007)–2008, Šibenik 2005–2009
 Noé Kwin – (SRB) – Spartak Subotica 2012–2013
 Emmanuel Mahi – (BIH, CRO) – Sloboda Tuzla 2004–2005, Orašje 2005–2006, Inter Zaprešić 2007–(2008)
 Yannick Makota – (CRO) – Pobeda Prilep 2018–2019
 Dieudonné Manga – (KOS) – Vushtrria 2015–2016
 Serge Manga – (KOS) – Drenica 2021–present
 Kombi Mandjang – (SVN) – Domžale 2016–2017
 Hatourna Manhouli – (BIH) – Olimpik Sarajevo 2010–2011
 John Mary – (SRB, SVN) – Vojvodina 2014–2016, Rudar Velenje 2016–2018
 Elie Matouke – (MNE) – OFK Titograd 2018–2019
 Bernard Rafael Mbassi – (SRB) – Rad Belgrade 2002–2003
 Emmanuel Mbella – (MKD, KOS) – Shkupi 2016–2018, Gjilani 2017–(2018), Sileks Kratovo (2018)–2019, Renova 2018–(2019)
 Jean Mbida – (SVN) – ND Gorica 2012–2013
 Thierry Mbognou – (SVN) – Krka 2013–2014
 Patrick Mevoungou – (MKD) – Renova 2007–2008
 Donald Molls – (CRO, BIH, SRB) – Lokomotiva Zagreb 2016–2019, Borac Banja Luka 2020–2022, Kolubara 2022–present
 Paul-Henri Mouasso – (MKD) – Skopje 2022–present
 Ousseini Mounpain – (MKD) – Skopje 2017–(2018)
 Leonard Mvogo – (BIH) – Široki Brijeg 2003–(2004)
 Dani Ndi – (CRO) – Istra 1961 2018–(2019)
 Valentine Ngaham – (SVN) – Domžale 2007–(2008)
 Alexis N'Gambi – (SRB) – Partizan Belgrade 2008–2009
 Ngalame Ngome – (BIH) – Čelik Zenica 2013–2014
 Jacques Nguemaleu – (SRB) – Napredak Kruševac 2009–2010
 Idriss Nguessi – (SRB) – Novi Pazar 2012–2013
 Christian Noah – (MKD) – Makedonija GP 2008–(2009)
 Jean Louis Nouken – (BIH) – Sarajevo 1997–1999, Đerzelez Zenica 1999–2000, Kiseljak (2000)–2001, Rudar Kakanj 2000–(2001)
 Théophile N'Tamé – (SVN) – Interblock 2008–2010
 Roland Ntoko – (SVN) – Elan 1922 1993–1994, Celje 1994–1996, Olimpija 1995–(1996), Korotan Prevalje 2000–2001
 Nicolas Nynkeu – (BIH, CRO) – Žepče 2004–2006, Croatia Sesvete 2006–2007, Hrvatski Dragovoljac 2007–2008, Slaven Belupo 2008–2011
 Patrice Nzekou – (KOS) – Drita Gjilan 2003–2004
 Joel Obele – (SVN) – Krka 2013–2014
 Franck Ohandza – (CRO) – Hajduk Split 2015–2018
 Fabrice Ondoa – (CRO) – Istra 1961 2020–(2021)
 Franck Onguene – (MNE) – Budućnost Podgorica 2010–2012
 Stephane Opele – (BIH) – Travnik 2003–2004
 André Ottou – (CRO) – Istra 1961 2005–2007
 Aboubakar Oumarou – (SRB) – Red Star Belgrade 2008–2009, OFK Belgrade 2009–2010, Vojvodina 2010–2013, Partizan Belgrade (2015)–2016, Napredak Kruševac 2019–2021
 Louise Essengue Parfait – (MKD) – Sileks Kratovo 2018–2019
 Claude Rygan – (SRB) – Partizan Belgrade 2003–(2004)
 Ernest Siankam – (CRO) – Hajduk Split 2001–2002
 Christian Biya Song – (KOS) – Trepça´89 2008–2011
 Alphonse Soppo – (MNE) – Rudar Pljevlja 2015–2019, Zeta 2019–2021
 Jacques Tabi – (SRB) – Hajduk Kula 2012–2013
 William Tabi – (BIH, CRO) – Široki Brijeg 2003–2006, Posušje 2006–2007, Šibenik 2007–2008, Croatia Sesvete 2008–2009, Zrinjski Mostar (2009)–2010
 Enow Juvette Tabot – (SVN) – Interblock 2009–2011
 Léandre Tawamba – (SRB) – Partizan Belgrade 2016–2018
 Didier Tayou – (SRB) – Sloboda Užice 2011–2013
 William Tchuameni – (CRO) – Inter Zaprešić 2019–2020
 Michel Vaillant Mbiobe – (SRB) – Napredak Kruševac 2014–2015, Mladost Lučani 2015–2017
 Ibrahim Walidjo – (SRB, KOS) – Javor Ivanjica 2012–2015, Liria Prizren 2018–2019
 Daniel Wansi – (CRO, MNE) – Inter Zaprešić (2003)–2004, Budućnost Podgorica 2007–(2008)
 Abdoulaye Yahaya – (CRO) – Lokomotiva Zagreb 2020–2021
 Basile Yamkam – (SRB) – Radnički Niš 2021–present
 Armand Dubois Yankep – (MKD, CRO) – Rabotnički Skopje 2004–2007, Inter Zaprešić 2008–2012
 Gabriel Zambe – (SVN) – Primorje 2004–2005
 Audrey Zepatta – (MKD) – Skopje 2021–2022

Canada
 Rejjan Abazi – (MKD) – Shkupi 2020–2022
 Kodjo Amla – (MKD) – Makedonija GP 2020–(2021)
 Milan Borjan – (SRB) – Rad Belgrade 2009–2011, Radnički Niš 2014–2015, Red Star Belgrade 2017–present
 Milan Božić – (SRB, BIH) – Zvezdara Belgrade 2001–2002, 2013–2015, Hajduk Belgrade 2002–2005, Leotar Trebinje 2008–2009
 Stefan Cebara – (SRB, SVN) – Rad Belgrade 2009–2010, Celje 2012–2013, Vojvodina 2017–2018
 Derek Cornelius – (SRB) – Javor Ivanjica 2016–2018
 Antoine Coupland – (CRO) – Rijeka (2022)–2023
 Nick Dasovic – (Yug/CRO) – Dinamo Zagreb 1989–1991, 1992–1993
 Srdjan Djekanovic – (SRB) – Zemun 2001–2002, Radnički Obrenovac 2002–2003
 Waldemar Dutra – (CRO) – Osijek 2003–2004
 Visar Hashani – (KOS) – KEK-u Kastriot 2018–2019
 Colin Jacques – (CRO) – Rudeš (2017)–2018, Istra 1961 2017–(2018)
 Dejan Jaković – (SRB) – Red Star Belgrade 2008–2009
 Ante Jazić – (CRO) – Hrvatski Dragovoljac 1997–1999, Hajduk Split 1999–2001
 Boban Kajgo – (SRB, BIH) – Smederevo 2009–2010, Leotar Trebinje (2011)–2012
 Adrian Kekec – (SVN, MKD) – Livar Ivančna Gorica 2007–2008, Pelister Bitola 2012–(2013)
 Fabijan Knežević – (CRO) – Kamen Ingrad 2006–2007
 Matthew Lam – (CRO) – Croatia Sesvete 2009–2011
 Jovan Lučić – (MKD, SRB) – Gorno Lisiče 2013–(2014), Rad Belgrade (2014)–2015
 Mladen Ljumovic – (MKD) – Akademija Pandev 2022–present
 Aleksa Marković – (SRB) – Zemun 2015–2016, 2017–2018
 Zachary Joel Mirosevic – (CRO) – Međimurje 2009–2011
 Marcos Nunes – (BIH) – Travnik 2013–2014
 Mario Ostojić – (SRB, BIH) – Milicionar Belgrade 1998–1999, Red Star Belgrade 2000–2001, Čelik Zenica 2004–2005
 Igor Prostran – (SRB) – Borac Čačak 2003–2004
 Kosovar Sadiki – (CRO) – Lokomotiva Zagreb 2017–2018
 Taj Charles Sangara – (CRO) – Lokomotiva Zagreb 2011–2012, RNK Split (2012)–2013
 Mike Stojanovic – (Yug/SRB) – Radnički Kragujevac 1969–1973
 Vladimir Vuković – (BIH) – Laktaši 2007–2010

Cape Verde
 Patrick Andrade – (SRB) – Partizan Belgrade 2022–present
 Nilton Fernandes – (SVN) – Koper 2006–2007, Maribor 2007–2009
 Ricardo Gomes – (SRB) – Partizan Belgrade 2018–2019, 2021–present
 Fábio Silva – (SVN) – Drava Ptuj 2007–2008

Central African Republic
 David Manga – (SRB) – Partizan Belgrade 2011–2012
 Sterling Yatéké – (CRO) – Rijeka 2019–2021

Chad
 Misdongarde Betolngar – (SRB, MNE) – Red Star Belgrade 2007–2008, Budućnost Podgorica 2008–2009, Metalac GM 2009–2012

Chile
 Mario Berrios – (SRB) – OFK Belgrade 2006–2007
 Bryan Carrasco – (CRO) – Dinamo Zagreb (2012)–2013
 Gonzalo Collao – (CRO) – Istra 1961 2021–2022
 Junior Fernándes – (CRO) – Dinamo Zagreb 2013–2017
 Sebastián Guerrero – (SRB) – Čukarički Belgrade (2013)–2014
 Ángelo Henríquez – (CRO) – Dinamo Zagreb 2014–2018
 Pedro Morales – (CRO) – Dinamo Zagreb 2008–2012
 Juan Carlos Muñoz – (CRO) – Dinamo Zagreb 1998–1999

China
 An Bang – (MNE) – Dečić Tuzi (2017)–2018
 Xuelei Ding – (SVN) – Ankaran Hrvatini 2017–(2018)
 Cheng Mouyi – (SRB) – Spartak Subotica 2010–2011
 Dai Lin – (BIH) – Slavija Sarajevo 2008–(2009)
 Dong Li – (SRB) – Metalac G.M. 2020–2021
 Feng Boyuan – (CRO) – Rudeš (2017)–2018
 Jia Xiuquan – (Yug/SRB) – Partizan Belgrade 1987–1989
 Li Chunyu – (SRB) – Rad Belgrade 2009–(2010)
 Li Haoran – (SVN) – Rudar Velenje 2018–(2019)
 Li Siqi – (SRB) – Inđija 2019–2020
 Liu Haiguang – (Yug/SRB) – Partizan Belgrade 1987–1989
 Runze Hao – (CRO, SRB) – Lokomotiva Zagreb 2015–2017, Radnički Niš 2019–2020
 Wang Lei – (SRB) – Mladost Lučani 2017–2018
 Yuan Xue – (SRB, MNE) – Radnik Surdulica 2016–(2017), Dečić Tuzi (2017)–2018
 Zhong Haoran – (SRB) – Spartak Subotica (2016)–2017, Borac Čačak (2017)–2018
 Yang Wenjie – (BIH) – Borac Banja Luka 2014–(2015)

Chinese Taipei
 Tim Chow – (SRB) – Spartak Subotica (2018)–2019

Colombia
 Yordy Bedoya – (CRO) – Šibenik 2021–2022
 Alexander Borja – (MKD) – Rabotnički Skopje 2016–2017, 2018–2020, Makedonija GP 2017–(2018), Pelister Bitola 2019–2021, Borec Veles 2020–(2021), Renova 2021–2022, Bregalnica Štip 2022–present
 Andrés Colorado – (SRB) – Partizan Belgrade 2022–present
 Yeferson Contreras – (CRO) – Šibenik (2020)–2021
 Darwin Garcia – (MNE) – Dečić Tuzi (2017)–2018
 Sebastián Herrera – (MKD) – Rabotnički Skopje 2015–2020, Bregalnica Štip (2022)–2023
 Phil Jackson – (BIH) – Laktaši (2008)–2009, Čelik Zenica 2008–2010, Zrinjski Mostar 2011–2012
 Haider Landázuri – (SRB) – Proleter Novi Sad 2021–2022
 José López – (CRO) – Šibenik 2021–2022
 Arleison Martínez – (KOS) – Llapi (2016)–2017
 Cristian Martínez Borja – (SRB) – Red Star Belgrade 2010–2012
 Danovis Martínez – (CRO) – Hrvatski Dragovoljac (2021)–2022
 Christian Mena – (CRO) – Šibenik 2020–2022
 Jhon Mena – (MKD) – Renova 2020–2022, Makedonija GP (2022)–2023 
 Juan Camilo Mesa – (CRO) – Šibenik 2020–present
 Marcos Mina – (CRO) – Šibenik 2020–present
 Mauricio Molina – (SRB) – Red Star Belgrade 2007–2008
 Juan Nieva – (CRO) – Šibenik (2020)–2021
 Armando Nieves – (KOS) – Liria Prizren 2018–2019
 Jhon Obregón – (MKD) – Vardar Skopje (2016)–2017
 Jorge Obregón – (CRO) – Varaždin 2019–2021, Rijeka 2021–present
 Dilan Ortiz – (SRB) – Čukarički Belgrade 2019–(2020), Mačva Šabac 2020–2021, Proleter Novi Sad (2021)–2022
 Nélson Pizarro – (SRB) – OFK Belgrade (2006)–2007
 Faver Ramírez – (MNE) – Jedinstvo Bijelo Polje 2022–(2023)
 Jhonny Riascos – (KOS) – Liria Prizren 2018–2019
 Rodrigo Rivas – (CRO) – Rudeš (2017)–2018
 Andrés Solano – (CRO) – Rijeka 2021–2023
 Carlos Torres – (CRO) – Šibenik 2020–present
 Gaspar Zapata – (MKD) – Pelister Bitola 2002–(2003)
 Hansel Zapata – (CRO) – Slaven Belupo 2021–2022

Comoros
 El Fardou Ben Nabouhane – (SRB) – Red Star Belgrade 2017–2023

Congo
 Archange Bintsouka – (KOS) – Drenica 2022–present
 Scott Bitsindou – (SRB) – Javor Ivanjica 2017–(2018)
 Victor Hamedi – (KOS) – Istogu 2015–2016, Hajvalia 2016–2017
 Marly Prince Heritier – (KOS) – Vushtrria 2019–2020, Trepça '89 2020–2021, (2022)–2023
 Rock Itoua-Ndinga – (MKD) – Pobeda Prilep 2006–2008, Škendija Tetovo 2007–(2008), Rabotnički Skopje (2008)–2009, Horizont Turnovo 2008–(2009)
 Antoine Makoumbou – (SVN) – Tabor Sežana 2020–2021, Maribor 2021–2022
 Flory Mbenza – (KOS) – Prishtina 2015–(2016)
 Prestige Mboungou – (SRB) – Metalac G.M. 2020–2021, 2021–(2022)
 Merveil Ndockyt – (CRO) – Osijek 2019–2022, HNK Gorica 2022–present
 Raddy Ovouka – (KOS) – Drita Gjilan 2022–present
 Poba Yubu Touré – (SRB) – Borac Čačak 2016–2017

DR Congo
 Joël Bopesu – (MKD) – Skopje 2017–2018, Rabotnički Skopje 2018–2019
 Gauthier Mankenda – (KOS) – Vushtrria 2015–2016, Prishtina 2016–present
 Francis Masiya – (SRB) – Borac Čačak 2016–2017
 Andréa Mbuyi-Mutombo – (CRO) – Rijeka 2012–2013, Istra 1961 2013–2015, RNK Split 2016–2017
 Kangana Ndiwa – (SVN) – Drava Ptuj 2005–2006
 Jordan Nkololo – (CRO) – Istra 1961 2018–(2019)
 Ibrahim Somé Salombo – (SRB) – Bežanija 2007–2008, Red Star Belgrade 2008–2009
 Joël Tshibamba – (SVN) – Koper (2016)–2017

Costa Rica
 Freddy Álvarez – (MKD) – Shkupi 2020–present
 Rónald González – (Yug/CRO) – Dinamo Zagreb 1990–1991
 Hernán Medford – (Yug/CRO) – Dinamo Zagreb 1990–1991
 John Jairo Ruiz – (SRB) – Red Star Belgrade 2016–2017

Côte d'Ivoire
 Roland Adjoumani – (KOS) – Besa Pejë 2014–2015
 Herve Amani – (SRB) – Javor Ivanjica 2017–2019
 Stephane Joel Barou – (BIH) – Velež Mostar (2022)–2023
 Bradji Dakouri – (MKD) – Shkupi 2018–2019
 Abdoulaye Diarra – (SVN) – Maribor 2006–2008
 Noumoufa Diarra – (KOS) – Trepça '89 2019–2020
 Kevin Doukouré – (SVN) – Tabor Sežana 2019–2022
 Ismaël Béko Fofana – (SRB) – Partizan Belgrade 2013–2016, Čukarički Belgrade 2016–2018, Vojvodina 2018–2019
 Néné Gbamblé – (SVN) – Celje 2021–2023
 Cèdric Gogoua – (SRB) – Partizan Belgrade 2015–2017
 Serge Gueï – (MNE) – Rudar Pljevlja 2010–2012
 Did'dy Guela – (CRO) – Dinamo Zagreb 2007–2008
 Alassane Razak Keita – (KOS) – Gjilani 2019–2022
 Aziz Lanzeni Keita – (KOS) – Gjilani 2019–present
 Mory Keita – (SVN) – Tabor Sežana 2021–(2022)
 Hamed Koné – (KOS) – Feronikeli 2017–2018
 Germain Kouadio – (BIH) – Sarajevo 2013–2015, Travnik 2015–2016, Zrinjski Mostar (2016)–2017, Čelik Zenica 2017–2018
 Denis Kouao – (SVN) – Tabor Sežana 2019–present
 Jean Evrard Kouassi – (CRO) – Hajduk Split 2012–2015
 Khalil Lambin – (MKD) – Shkupi (2016)–2017
 Ismaël Maiga – (SRB) – Radnički Niš 2022–present
 Marcel Metoua – (SRB) – Banat Zrenjanin 2008–2011
 Ibrahima Omattore – (KOS) – Besa Pejë 2014–2015
 Salia Ouattara – (SRB) – Mladost Lučani 2014–2015
 Adama Samake – (MKD) – Makedonija GP 2022–present
 Sékou Sanogo – (SRB) – Red Star Belgrade 2019–present
 Tremoso Noieme Traore – (KOS) – Besa Pejë 2014–2015
 Guy Yaméogo – (SVN) – Tabor Sežana 2019–(2020)
 Steve Dosfellos Zhogo – (KOS) – Besa Pejë 2014–2015

Cuba
 Marcel Hernández – (KOS) – Trepça '89 2017–2018

Curaçao
 Bradley Martis – (SVN) – Celje 2020–2021
 Rocky Siberie – (SVN) – Maribor 2005–2006

Cyprus
 Nikolas Asprogenis – (SRB) – Partizan Belgrade 2004–2007
 Epaminondas Christinakis – (CRO) – Varteks 2002–(2003)
 Martinos Christofi – (KOS) – Llapi 2022–present
 Siniša Dobrasinović – (MNE) – Rudar Pljevlja 1997–1999
 Siniša Gogić – (Yug/SRB) – Radnički Niš 1982–1987, Rad Belgrade 1987–1989
 Alexander Spoljaric – (SRB) – OFK Belgrade 2014–2017
 Milenko Spoljaric – (Yug/CRO, SRB) – Osijek 1987–1989, OFK Belgrade 1989–1992
 Vladan Tomić – (Yug/SRB) – Radnički Niš 1990–1991

Czech Republic
 Denis Alijagić – (SVN) – Maribor 2022–present
 Dušan Bártek – (Yug/BIH) – SAŠK Sarajevo 1928–1929, Slavija Sarajevo 1929–1939
 Michael Bártek – (Yug/BIH) – Slavija Sarajevo 1929–1939
 Nikola Beneš – (Yug/SRB) – Građanski Niš 1935–1936
 Jaroslav Bohata – (Yug/CRO) – Hajduk Split 1923
 Otto Bohata – (Yug/CRO) – Hajduk Split 1913, 1919
 Josef Čapek – (Yug/SRB) – Vojvodina 1920
 Marcel Čermák – (SVN) – Aluminij 2018–2021
 Jaroslav Červený – (Yug/CRO) – Concordia Zagreb 1921
 František Haas – (Yug/SRB) – NAK Novi Sad 1935–1939, Vojvodina 1940–1941
 Miloš Eckert – (Yug/SRB) – BSK Belgrade 1911–1914, 1918–1924
 Karel Jahn – (Yug/BIH) – SAŠK Sarajevo 1926–1927
 Jiří Jeslínek – (Yug/CRO) – Hajduk Split 1990–1991
 Jiří Jeslínek – (SVN) – Celje 2014–2015
 Pavel Knietel – (BIH) – Olimpik Sarajevo 2001–2002
 František Kotrba – (Yug/SRB) – NAK Novi Sad 1935–1937
 Miloslav Kousal – (SVN) – Celje 2001–2002
 Lubomír Kubica – (SVN) – Maribor 2007–2009
 Petr Laga – (CRO) – Inter Zaprešić 2005–(2006)
 Jan Lecjaks – (CRO) – Dinamo Zagreb 2017–2018, Lokomotiva Zagreb 2018–2019
 Alois Machek – (Yug/SRB) – Jugoslavija Belgrade 1920–1925
 Milan Macik – (SVN) – Nafta Lendava 2006–2007
 Dušan Melichárek – (CRO) – Inter Zaprešić 2015–2018
 František Metelka – (SVN) – Rudar Velenje 2009–2011
 Jaroslav Nesvadba – (CRO) – Inter Zaprešić 2007–2008
 Robert Peschek – (Yug/BIH) – SAŠK Sarajevo 1921–1922
 Jaroslav Peškar – (SVN) – Domžale 2007–2008
 Václav Petrovický – (Yug/SRB) – Jugoslavija Belgrade 1920–1921
 Václav Pinc – (Yug/CRO) – Hajduk Split 1922–1923
 Tomáš Poláček – (SRB) – Sloboda Užice 2010–2011
 Aleš Schuster – (BIH) – Zvijezda Gradačac 2008–2009
 Bohuslav Seger – (Yug/SVN) – Ilirija Ljubljana 1920–1922
 Karel Senecký – (Yug/CRO) – Hajduk Split 1937
 Stefan Simić – (CRO) – Hajduk Split 2019–present
 Karel Skopový – (Yug/BIH) – Željezničar Sarajevo 1946–1950
 Miroslav Slepička – (CRO) – Dinamo Zagreb 2008–2011
 Rudolf Sloup-Štapl – (Yug/CRO) – Hajduk Split 1920–1921
 Jiří Sobotka – (Yug/CRO) – Hajduk Split 1940–1941
 Jindřich Šoltys – (Yug/CRO) – Hajduk Split 1922–1923
 Marcel Sparci – (MNE) – OFK Petrovac 2007–2008
 Karl Stalekar – (Yug/SVN) – Železničar Maribor 1938–1941
 Karel Stiasný – (Yug/CRO) – Hajduk Split 1919
 Petr Stoilov – (CRO, MKD) – Zadar 1998–1999, Makedonija GP 1999–2000
 Nicolas Šumský – (SVN) – ND Gorica (2013)–2014
 Pavel Volšík – (SVN) – Olimpija 2001–2002
 Jan Vondra – (MKD) – Škendija Tetovo (2022)–2023
 Tomáš Zelenka – (SVN) – Olimpija 2001–2002
 Frano Zoubek – (Yug/CRO) – Hajduk Split 1920–1921

Denmark
 Søren Christensen – (CRO) – Slaven Belupo 2015–2017
 Adam Jakobsen – (SVN) – Celje 2021–2022
 Rasmus Lauritsen – (CRO) – Dinamo Zagreb 2020–2023
 Ardit Nesimi – (MKD) – Shkupi 2022–present
 Andrija Rajović – (SRB, BIH, MNE) – Spartak Subotica 2020–2022, Rudar Prijedor (2021)–2022, Iskra Danilovgrad 2022–present
 Nikolaj Rasmussen – (CRO) – Dinamo Zagreb 1997–(1998)
 Nikola Sarić – (CRO) – Hajduk Split (2011)–2012

Dominican Republic
 Eduardo Acevedo – (BIH) – Rudar Prijedor 2012–2013
 Christian Schoissengeyr – (SVN) – Domžale (2022)–2023

Ecuador
 Augusto Batioja – (SRB, MNE) – Inđija (2010)–2011, OFK Belgrade 2010–2013, Mladost Podgorica (2013)–2014, Radnički Niš (2014)–2015
 Adalberto Canga – (MNE) – Dečić Tuzi 2013–2015
 Eber Caicedo – (MNE) – Mladost Podgorica 2011–2013
 Jonathan Caicedo – (CRO) – Istra 1961 2018–2019
 Walberto Caicedo – (SRB) – Metalac GM 2015–2018
 Segundo Castillo – (SRB) – Red Star Belgrade 2006–2008
 José Gutiérrez – (SRB) – Novi Pazar 2014–(2015)
 Willer Marret – (MNE) – Dečić Tuzi 2013–2015
 David Matute – (MKD) – Horizont Turnovo 2015–2016
 Jainer Medina – (SRB) – Spartak Subotica 2017–2018
 José Mina – (SRB) – Novi Pazar 2014–(2015)
 Franklin Salas – (SRB) – Red Star Belgrade 2007–2008
 Joel Valencia – (SVN) – Koper 2015–2017

Egypt
 Riad Aliriza – (SVN) – Zagorje 2004–2005
 Mohammed Abd Rabo – (SVN) – Olimpija 2004–(2005)

El Salvador
 Dennis Alas – (KOS) – Feronikeli 2014–2015
 Vladan Vicevic – (Yug/SRB) – Sloboda Užice 1986–1996, 1999–2002

England
 Alexander Cvetković – (CRO) – Šibenik (2021)–2022, Hrvatski Dragovoljac 2021–(2022)
 Matthias Fanimo – (BIH, CRO, SVN) – Mladost Doboj Kakanj 2018–2020, Sarajevo 2020–2022, Slaven Belupo (2022)–2023, Koper 2022–present
 Ben Gill – (SVN) – Interblock 2009–2010
 Guri Hana – (KOS) – Besa Pejë 2020–(2021)
 Haris Hodzic – (BIH) – Rudar Prijedor 2012–(2013)
 Leo Jauković – (MNE) – Iskra Danilovgrad 2021–present
 Yoan Marc–Olivier – (KOS) – Malisheva 2021–2023, Ballkani 2022–present
 Dion Miftari – (KOS) – Llapi (2021)–2022
 Rhema Obed – (SVN) – Krško (2015)–2016
 Jamie Sheldon – (SVN) – Interblock 2009–(2010)
 Ronald Sobowale – (KOS) – Malisheva 2021–present
 James Stone – (Yug/CRO) – Građanski Zagreb 1920–1921
 Hong Wan – (CRO) – Varaždin 2019–(2020)
 Neil Wood – (BIH) – Željezničar Sarajevo 2007–2008

Equatorial Guinea
 Rubén Belima – (SVN) – Koper 2015–2017, Domžale (2018)–2019
 Basilio Ndong – (MKD) – Shkupi 2017–2020
 Emilio Nsue – (BIH) – Tuzla City 2021–(2022)
 Mariano Ondo – (MKD) – Shkupi 2017–2018

Estonia
 Ilja Antonov – (SVN) – Rudar Velenje 2017–2018
 Mattias Käit – (SVN) – Domžale 2019–2021
 Kevin Kauber – (SVN) – Krka 2014–2015
 Aleksandr Kulinitš (SVN) – Krško 2017–2018
 Frank Liivak – (BIH) – Sarajevo 2016–2018
 Mark Oliver Roosnupp – (SRB) – Napredak Kruševac 2022–present
 Rauno Sappinen – (SVN) – Domžale (2019)–2020
 Konstantin Vassiljev – (SVN) – Nafta Lendava 2007–2011, Koper 2010–(2011)

Ethiopia
 Walid Atta – (CRO) – Lokomotiva Zagreb 2010–2011, Dinamo Zagreb (2011)–2012

Finland
 Bakr Abdellaoui – (MKD) – Akademija Pandev 2021–(2022)
 Lauri Dalla Valle – (SRB) – Zemun (2017)–2018
 Marko Kolsi – (SVN) – Maribor 2007–2008, Rudar Velenje 2008–2011, Celje (2012)–2013
 Njazi Kuqi – (KOS) – Kosova Vushtrri (2013)–2014
 Shpat Qerimi – (CRO) – RNK Split (2010)–2011
 Timo Stavitski – (CRO) – Osijek (2018)–2019
 Samu Volotinen – (BIH) – Čelik Zenica 2018–2019

France
 Gloire Antonio – (MKD) – Pelister Bitola 2021–2022
 Komlan Attohoun – (KOS) – Vllaznia Pozheran 2017–2018
 Jean-Christophe Bahebeck – (SRB) – Partizan Belgrade 2020–2021
 Axel Bakayoko – (SRB) – Red Star Belgrade 2020–2022, Novi Pazar 2021–(2022)
 Théo Barbet – (CRO) – Lokomotiva Zagreb 2021–2022
 Julio Barrabes – (CRO) – Istra 1961 2010–2011
 Ivan Bek – (Yug/SRB) – BSK Belgrade 1925–1928 (both Yugoslav and French international)
 Maxime Benayer – (Yug/SRB) – BSK Belgrade 1923–1924
 Selim Bouadla – (FRA) – Slaven Belupo 2016–2018
 Jonathan Bumbu – (SVN) – Radomlje 2021–2022
 Sory Camara – (MNE) – Dečić Tuzi 2017–2018
 Omar Correia – (SVN) – Koper 2022–present
 Souleymane Coulibaly – (KOS, MKD) – Drenica 2019–(2020), Renova (2020)–2021
 Nathan Cruce-Corcy – (CRO) – HNK Gorica 2022–present
 Marco da Silva – (SVN) – Krško 2017–2019, Domžale 2019–2020
 Raoul Delgado – (SVN) – Ankaran Hrvatini 2017–2018
 Jordan Diakiese – (CRO) – Rudeš 2018–2019
 Abdelaye Diakité – (SVN) – ND Gorica (2013)–2014
 Loïs Diony – (SRB) – Red Star Belgrade 2021–2022
 Naïs Djouahra – (CRO) – Rijeka 2022–present
 Boubacari Doucouré – (SRB) – Javor Ivanjica 2020–(2021), 2022–present, TSC Bačka Topola 2021–(2022)
 Boucif El Afghani – (SVN) – Tabor Sežana (2022)–2023
 Aboubaker Es Sahhal – (MKD) – Škendija Tetovo 2019–2021
 Michel Espinosa  – (CRO) – Istra 1961 2018–2019
 Willy Fondja – (SVN) – Maribor 2007–(2008)
 Maka Gakou – (SRB) – Radnički Niš 2022–present
 Zacharie Iscaye – (SVN) – Tabor Sežana 2021–present
 Joe Jeanjacques – (KOS) – Trepça '89 2019–2021
 Goran Jerković – (SRB, MNE) – Jagodina (2015)–2016, Iskra Danilovgrad 2015–(2016)
 Thadée Kaleba – (SVN) – Tabor Sežana 2022–present
 Nabil Khali – (SVN) – Tabor Sežana 2022–present
 Alexandre Klopp – (CRO) – Šibenik 2021–(2022)
 Hugo Komano – (SVN) – Tabor Sežana 2021–(2022)
 Moussa Konaté – (MKD) – Mladost Carev Dvor 2015–(2016)
 Damien Le Tallec – (SRB) – Red Star Belgrade 2015–2018
 Christopher Makengo – (SVN) – Aluminij 2017–(2018)
 Prince Mambouana – (KOS) – Arbëria (2020)–2021
 Axel Maraval – (SVN) – Domžale 2015–2016
 Paulo Marques – (CRO) – Cibalia Vinkovci 2001–2002
 Yoann Martelat – (BIH) – Sloboda Tuzla (2019)–2020
 Bradley Meledje – (SVN) – Ankaran Hrvatini 2017–2018
 Jean-Philippe Mendy – (SVN, CRO) – Koper 2012–2013, Maribor 2013–2016, Slaven Belupo 2017–2019
 Martin Mimoun – (SVN) – Olimpija Ljubljana 2015–2016
 Anthony Monin – (KOS) – Llapi 2020–(2021)
 Benjamin Morel – (SVN) – Domžale 2014–2016, (2016)–2017
 Marko Muslin – (SRB) – Red Star Belgrade 2003–2004
 Timothé Nkada – (SVN) – Koper 2022–present
 Darly N'Landu – (SVN) – Radomlje 2022–present
 Sacha Petshi – (SRB) – Sloboda Užice 2013–2014
 Axel Prohouly – (SVN) – Radomlje 2021–(2022)
 Evan Salines – (KOS) – Vushtrria 2019–2020
 Malik Sellouki – (SVN) – Maribor 2021–2022
 Nicolas Senzemba  – (CRO) – Istra 1961 (2018)–2019
 Nsana Simon – (SVN) – Bravo 2021–present
 Darnel Situ – (SVN) – Koper 2015–2016
 Nikola Stojanović – (SRB) – Napredak Kruševac (2020)–2021
 Banfa Sylla – (SRB) – Rad Belgrade 2011–2012
 Roger Tamba M'Pinda – (CRO) – Osijek 2018–2019
 Jérémy Taravel – (CRO) – Dinamo Zagreb 2013–2016
 Aliou Badara Traoré – (KOS, MKD) – Kosova Vushtrri 2015–2016, Shkupi 2016–2017
 Antonin Trilles – (SVN) – Domžale 2014–2015

French Guiana
 Kévin Rimane – (CRO) – Istra 1961 2018–(2019)

Gabon
 Georges Ambourouet – (MKD) – Makedonija GP 2008–2010
 Anselme Délicat – (Yug/SRB) – Vojvodina 1983–1986
 Guélor Kanga – (SRB) – Red Star Belgrade 2016–2018, 2020–present
 Beni Kiendé – (MKD) – Makedonija GP 2008–2010
 Yannick Larry – (MKD) – Makedonija GP 2007–2008
 Fahd Ndzengue – (SVN) – Tabor Sežana 2019–present
Serge-Junior Martinsson Ngouali – (CRO) – HNK Gorica 2020–2022

Gambia
 Muhammed Badamosi – (SRB) – Čukarički Belgrade 2022–present
 Ebrima Badje – (MKD) – Rabotnički Skopje (2021)–2022
 Hamza Barry – (CRO) – Hajduk Split 2016–2020
 Lamin Colley – (SVN) – ND Gorica 2020–2021, Koper 2021–2022
 Alieu Darbo – (CRO) – Dinamo Zagreb (2013)–2014
 Dembo Darboe – (MKD) – Shkupi 2019–2021
 Lamin Darboe – (MKD) – Rabotnički Skopje (2021)–2022
 Madi Karamo Fatty – (KOS) – Trepça '89 2022–present
 Ismaila Jagne – (KOS) – Trepça 2006–2007
 Tijan Jaiteh – (SVN) – Koper (2015)–2016
 Adama Jarjue – (SRB) – Zlatibor Čajetina (2020)–2021
 Modou Jobe – (SRB) – Inđija 2020–(2021)
 Pa Omar Jobe – (MKD) – Škendija Tetovo 2021–(2022), Struga 2021–(2022)
 Moussa Kamara – (KOS) – Ferizaj (2022)–2023
 Ousman Koli – (SVN, BIH) – Triglav Kranj 2011–2012, Mladost Doboj Kakanj 2015–2016
 Ousman Marong – (SRB, MKD) – Red Star Belgrade 2019–2021, Akademija Pandev 2021–2022, Radnik Surdulica 2022–present
 Basiru Mbye – (KOS) – Feronikeli 2019–2021
 Mustapha Kamal N'Daw – (MKD) – Teteks Tetovo 2009–(2010)
 Lamin Samateh – (CRO) – Lokomotiva Zagreb 2010–2014
 Kaba Sambou – (KOS) – Trepça '89 2016–(2017)
 Omar Sise – (SVN) – Celje 1998–1999

Georgia
 Irakli Azarovi – (SRB) – Red Star Belgrade 2022–present
 Mikheil Ergemlidze – (MKD) – Akademija Pandev 2022–present
 Irakli Goginashvili – (SRB) – Novi Pazar (2015)–2016
 Giorgi Guliashvili – (BIH) – Sarajevo 2022–present
 Giorgi Iluridze – (CRO) – Hajduk Split 2013–2014
 Giorgi Ivaniadze – (BIH) – Tuzla City 2022–present
 Jaba Jighauri – (MKD) – Vardar Skopje 2016–2018
 Mikheil Khutsishvili – (SRB) – Vojvodina 2008–2010
 Davit Kokhia – (SRB) – Vojvodina 2014–(2015)
 Levan Kutalia – (BIH) – Slavija Sarajevo 2008–2010, Zrinjski Mostar 2010–2012
 Giorgi Kutsia – (MKD) – Rabotnički Skopje 2021–present
 Apollon Lemondzhava – (BIH) – Rudar Prijedor (2012)–2013
 Gagi Margvelashvili – (MKD) – Shkupi 2021–present
 Giorgi Merebashvili – (SRB) – Vojvodina 2009–2012
 Giorgi Mchedlishvili – (CRO) – HNK Gorica 2018–2019
 Giorgi Papunashvili – (SRB) – Radnički Niš (2022)–2023
 Anton Tolordava – (SRB) – Radnički Niš (2022)–2023

Germany
 Irfan Ajdinović – (BIH) – Olimpik Sarajevo 2016–2017
 Alexander Arsovic – (SRB) – OFK Belgrade 2001–2003, Red Star Belgrade 2004–2005
 Daniel Arsovic – (BIH) – Leotar Trebinje 2008–2009
 Berat Ayyildiz – (BIH) – Mladost Doboj Kakanj 2018–2019
 Boris Binkovski – (Yug/SVN) – Maribor 1967–1972
 Fredi Bobic – (CRO) – Rijeka 2005–(2006)
 Martin Budic – (BIH) – Posušje 2007–2009
 Fatjon Celani – (KOS) – Malisheva 2022–present
 Mohamed Cherif – (MNE) – Jezero Plav 2022–present
 Rudolf Corn – (Yug/SVN) – Olimpija 1962–1970
 Frank Dreiseitel – (Yug/CRO) – Građanski Zagreb 1940–1941
 Ahmed Dzafic – (BIH) – Zvijezda Gradačac 2012–(2013), Čelik Zenica 2014–2016
 Alim Esgi – (BIH) – Čelik Zenica 2019–(2020)
 Erich Feldmann – (Yug/SRB) – BUSK Belgrade 1924–1925
 Petar Filipović – (CRO) – Cibalia Vinkovci 2012–2013, Slaven Belupo (2013–2015)
 Antonio Fischer – (KOS) – Flamurtari Prishtina 2017–2018
 André Fomitschow – (CRO) – Hajduk Split 2017–2019
 Oliver Gorgiev – (MKD) – Vardar Skopje 2005–2006
 Admir Hadzisulejmanovic – (BIH) – Travnik (2011)–2012
 Marcel Heister – (CRO) – Zadar 2012–2013, Istra 1961 2013–2016
 Engjëll Hoti – (KOS) – Trepça '89 2018–2020, Llapi 2020–present
 Nikola Ilić – (SRB, MKD) – Borac Čačak (2016)–2017, Shkupi 2016–(2017)
 Senad Jarović – (SVN, BIH) – Domžale 2017–2018, Sloboda Tuzla 2022–present
 Törles Knöll – (CRO) – Slaven Belupo 2020–2021
 Georg Koch – (CRO) – Dinamo Zagreb 2007–2008
 Marijan Kovačević – (BIH) – Široki Brijeg 2001–(2002)
 Trim Krasnici – (KOS) – Feronikeli 2017–2018
 Luka Lošić – (SRB) – Voždovac 2017–2019
 Kreshnik Lushtaku – (KOS) – Prishtina 2015–2017, Drenica 2017–2018
 Marko Marin – (SRB) – Red Star Belgrade 2018–2020
 Otto Magerle – (Yug/BIH) – SAŠK Sarajevo 1924–1925
 Nils Mema – (KOS) – Prishtina 2019–present
 Khaled Mesfin – (CRO) – Inter Zaprešić 2016–2017
 Maksimilijan Milovanović – (BIH) – Borac Banja Luka (2021)–2022
 Borel Moukoko – (KOS) – Ferizaj (2022)–2023
 Gustav Mut – (Yug/SRB) – Grafičar Belgrade 1931–1932
 Daniel Njitraj – (BIH) – Široki Brijeg 2007–2008
 Radomir Novaković – (SRB) – Inđija 2020–2021
 Levent-Pierre Novy – (BIH) – Laktaši 2009–(2010)
 Jens Nowotny – (CRO) – Dinamo Zagreb 2006–2007
 Reagy Ofosu – (CRO) – Istra 1961 (2017)–2018
 Aleksandro Petrovic – (SRB) – Zemun 2006–2008, Čukarički Belgrade 2007–(2008)
 Matthias Predojević – (SRB) – Milicionar Belgrade 1997–1999, Vojvodina 2001–2002
 Robert Puha – (Yug/SRB) – Spartak Subotica 1989–1990
 Grgur Radoš – (CRO) – Varteks 2006–2008
 Adonis Ruhani – (KOS) – Besa Pejë 2016–2017, Drita Gjilan 2017–2018
 Andi Seferi – (KOS) – Arbëria 2020–(2021)
 Murat Sejdović – (BIH) – Travnik 2010–2012
 Alperen Sipahi – (BIH) – Laktaši 2009–(2010)
 Rijad Tafilović – (SRB) – Novi Pazar (2014)–2015
 Enis Terziqi – (KOS) – Trepça '89 2015–2017
 Marin Topić – (CRO) – Inter Zaprešić 2018–2020, Lokomotiva Zagreb (2020)–2021
 Thomas Vasov – (SRB) – Borac Čačak 1993–1996
 Robert Voloder – (SVN) – Maribor (2021)–2022
 Stephan Vujčić – (MKD, CRO) – Rabotnički Skopje 2010–2011, 2013–2015, Inter Zaprešić 2011–2013, Škendija Tetovo (2017)–2018, Shkupi 2017–2018, Belasica 2018–2019
 Valentino Vujinović – (BIH) – Široki Brijeg 2021–present
 Rudolf Winkler – (Yug/SVN) – Rote Elf 1920
 Filip Žderić – (BIH, CRO) – GOŠK Gabela 2011–2013, 2014–2015, Cibalia Vinkovci 2015–2017

Ghana
 Jacob Aboosah – (CRO) – Rijeka (2022)–2023
 Rashid Abubakar – (BIH) – Sarajevo (2022)–2023
 Sadick Abubakar – (SRB) – Radnik Surdulica 2022–present
 Abdul Latif Abubakari – (SVN) – Rudar Velenje (2018)–2019
 Boadu Maxwell Acosty – (CRO) – Rijeka 2017–2020
 Gideon Acquah – (CRO) – Istra 1961 2021–(2022)
 Reuben Acquah – (CRO) – Lokomotiva Zagreb 2020–2021
 Sadick Adams – (SRB) – Vojvodina 2009–(2010)
 Bright Addae – (SVN) – ND Gorica (2013)–2014
 Addoquaye Addo – (SRB) – Red Star Belgrade 2007–(2008)
 Daniel Addo – (MKD) – Vardar Skopje 2005–2007
 Edmund Addo – (SRB) – Spartak Subotica 2022–present
 Lee Addy – (SRB, CRO) – Red Star Belgrade 2010–2012, Dinamo Zagreb 2012–2014, Lokomotiva Zagreb 2014–2015, Čukarički Belgrade (2015)–2016
 Dominic Adiyiah – (SRB) – Partizan Belgrade 2010–(2011)
 David Adjei – (SVN) – Beltinci 1997–2000, Triglav Kranj 1998–(1999), Mura 2000–2002
 Evans Adomako – (SVN) – Rudar Velenje 2018–2019
 Brahim Adowa – (BIH) – Zvijezda 09 2017–2018
 Nasri Adowa – (BIH) – Zvijezda 09 2017–2018
 Ebenezer Adukwaw – (KOS) – Trepça '89 2022–present
 Stanley Afedzie – (BIH) – Zrinjski Mostar 2009–2010
 Dickson Afoakwa – (SVN) – Triglav Kranj (2018)–2019
 Francis Afriyie – (SRB) – Vojvodina 2016–2018
 Samuel Afum – (SRB) – Spartak Subotica 2018–2019
 Benjamin Agyare – (KOS) – Drita Gjilan 2022–present, Drenica 2022–present
 Gershon Akuffo – (SRB, BIH) – Napredak Kruševac 2009–2010, Leotar Trebinje 2011–2012
 Karim Alhassan – (SRB) – Radnički Kragujevac 2013–(2014)
 Latif Amadu – (KOS) – Llapi 2021–(2022)
 Augustine Ameworlorna – (KOS) – Trepça '89 2022–present
 Eric Amo – (MKD) – Pobeda Prilep (2022)–2023
 Joseph Amoah – (BIH) – Rudar Prijedor 2021–2022, Željezničar Sarajevo 2022–present
 Prince Ampem – (CRO) – Šibenik 2020–2021, Rijeka 2021–present
 Prince Amponsah – (MKD) – Pelister Bitola 2020–2022
 Thomas Amugi – (CRO) – Zadar 2000–2006
 Samuel Mone Andoh – (KOS) – Prishtina 2020–2022
 Ahmed Ankrah – (SVN) – ND Gorica 2022–present
 Yaw Antwi – (SRB) – Napredak Kruševac 2009–2010, Vojvodina 2010–2012, 2012–2013, Metalac GM 2011–(2012)
 Bismarck Appiah – (SRB) – Bačka Bačka Palanka 2016–2017, Mladost Lučani 2017–2018
 Eric Appiah – (SRB) – Metalac G.M. 2021–2022
 Stephen Appiah – (SRB) – Vojvodina 2011–2012

 Jeremiah Arkorful – (CRO) – Hajduk Split 2014–2015
 Alfred Arthur – (SRB) – Jagodina 2008–2009
 Prince Arthur – (CRO) – Rijeka (2022)–2023
 Kennedy Asamoah – (SRB) – Borac Čačak 2016–2017
 Nathaniel Asamoah – (SRB) – Red Star Belgrade 2011–2013
 Jonas Asare – (SRB) – Javor Ivanjica 2016–2018
 Richard Asare – (KOS) – Liria Prizren 2016–(2017), Trepça '89 2017–2020, Vëllaznimi Gjakova 2017–2018
 Augustine Awiah – (KOS) – Drenica 2017–2019
 Nana Kofi Babil – (SVN) – Aluminij 2021–2022
 Abdul Bashiru – (KOS) – Prishtina 2017–2019
 Abdul Khalid Basit – (KOS, MKD) – Prishtina 2015–2019, Makedonija GP (2020)–2021, 2022–present
 Joseph Bempah – (SRB) – Vojvodina 2016–2018, Proleter Novi Sad 2018–2019
 Emmanuel Boakye – (SVN) – Mura 05 (2012)–2013
 Eric Boakye – (SVN) – Olimpija Ljubljana 2017–2022
 Richmond Boakye – (SRB) – Red Star Belgrade 2016–2018, 2018–2021
 Kennedy Boateng – (SRB) – Jagodina 2008–2010
 Kwame Boateng – (SRB) – Metalac GM 2011–2012
 Prince Bobby – (BIH) – Zrinjski Mostar 2009–2010
 Godwin Osei Bonsu – (SRB) – Radnički Kragujevac 2014–2015
 Francis Bossman – (SRB, MNE) – Sloboda Užice 2010–2012, 2014–2015, Jagodina 2012–(2013), Mornar Bar 2015–2016
 Osman Bukari – (SRB) – Red Star Belgrade 2022–present
 Bismark Charles – (KOS) – Vushtrria 2019–2020, Trepça '89 (2020)–2021
 Joseph Cudjoe – (SRB) – Radnički Kragujevac (2014)–2015
 Haminu Draman – (SRB) – Red Star Belgrade 2005–2006
 Abraham Frimpong – (SRB) – Vojvodina (2011)–2012, Napredak Kruševac 2011–2016, Red Star Belgrade 2016–2018
 Abel Hammond – (SRB) – Metalac GM 2010–2011
 Nasir Ibrahim – (KOS) – Flamurtari Prishtina 2018–2019
 Baba Iddi – (MKD) – Vardar Skopje 2008–2009
 Abass Issah – (SVN, CRO) – Olimpija Ljubljana 2016–2018, Rijeka 2021–2022
 Mohammed-Awal Issah – (SRB) – Red Star Belgrade 2008–2011
 Kojo Kankam – (SRB) – Radnički Niš 2012–2013
 Patrick Kesse – (CRO) – Varaždin (2019)–2020, 2020–(2021)
 Osei Kofi – (MKD) – Drita Bogovinje 2012–2013
 Owusu-Ansah Kontor – (SRB) – Metalac GM 2011–2015, Novi Pazar 2015–2016
 Abraham Kumedor – (MNE) – Budućnost Podgorica 2008–2011
 Francis Kyeremeh – (SRB, BIH) – Jagodina 2015–2016, Radnik Surdulica 2016–2019, Sarajevo 2022–present
 Derrick Mensah – (SVN) – Aluminij 2016–2018
 Ibrahim Mensah – (SVN) – Krško 2016–2017, Aluminij 2017–2018, Bravo 2019–2020
 Patrick Mensah – (MKD) – Shkupi 2021–(2022)
 Ekow Mills – (KOS) – Drita Gjilan 2022–present
 Abubakar Moro – (SRB) – Donji Srem 2014–2015
 Issah Moro – (SVN, KOS) – Beltinci 1997–1999, Olimpija 1999–2000, Trepça´89 2005–2006
 Nasiru Moro – (CRO) – HNK Gorica 2018–2021
 Ibrahim Mustapha – (SRB) – Zlatibor Čajetina (2020)–2021, Novi Pazar 2021–(2022), Red Star Belgrade (2022)–2023
 Jasper Nimo Nartey – (BIH) – Rudar Prijedor (2015)–2016
 Clinton Nnorom – (KOS) – Vushtrria 2019–present
 Ebenezer Nunoo – (SVN) – Krško 2016–2017
 Abdul Rashid Obuobi – (SRB) – Donji Srem 2014–2016, Voždovac 2020–2021
 Ferdinand Opoku – (SRB) – Rad Belgrade 2011–2012
 Kwaku Bonsu Osei – (SRB) – Spartak Subotica 2022–present
 Quincy Osei – (SRB) – Hajduk Kula 2011–2012
 George Owusu – (BIH) – Rudar Prijedor (2015)–2016
 Samuel Owusu – (SRB) – Radnik Surdulica 2014–2016, Čukarički Belgrade 2017–2019, 2022–present
 Vilson Kwame Owusu – (SRB) – Čukarički Belgrade (2019)–2020
 Courage Pekuson – (SVN) – Koper 2016–2017
 Ben Quansah – (KOS) – Prishtina (2017)–2018, Flamurtari Prishtina 2018–2020
 Moustapha Quaynor – (MKD) – Pelister Bitola 2017–(2018)
 Abdul Rashid Fuseini – (SRB) – TSC Bačka Topola 2022–present
 Obeng Regan – (SRB, CRO) – Napredak Kruševac 2012–2014, Čukarički Belgrade 2014–2017, Inter Zaprešić 2017–2018, Istra 1961 2018–2021, Mladost Lučani 2020–(2021)
 Emmanuel Sackey – (CRO) – Marsonia 1995–1996
 Emmanuel Sarpong – (KOS) – Drita Gjilan 2017–2018
 Felix Siameh – (KOS) – Trepça 2014–2015
 Sadam Sulley – (KOS) – Prishtina 2021–(2022)
 Rashid Sumaila – (SRB) – Red Star Belgrade 2018–2019
 Zakaria Suraka – (SRB, BIH, MNE) – Radnik Surdulica 2015–2016, Dinamo Vranje 2016–2019, Mladost Lučani (2019)–2020, Mladost Doboj Kakanj 2019–(2020), Rudar Pljevlja 2020–present
 Prince Tagoe – (SRB) – Partizan Belgrade 2010–2011
 Ibrahim Tanko – (SRB) – Red Star Belgrade 2017–2019, Mladost Lučani 2019–2020, Javor Ivanjica 2020–(2021), 2022–present
 Michael Tawiah – (SRB) – Borac Čačak 2014–2015
 Daniel Tette – (KOS) – Trepça '89 (2022)–2023
 Nana Welbeck – (SVN, BIH) – Krka 2014–2016, Mladost Doboj Kakanj 2018–2019
 Stephen Wiredu – (SVN) – Krško 2018–2019
 Alex Yamoah – (MNE) – Zeta 2018–2021
 Ahmed Ramzy Yussif – (CRO) – HNK Gorica 2018–2019

Greece
 Theodoros Apostolidis – (Yug/SRB) – Bor 1969–1972
 Nikolaos Baxevanos – (SRB) – Spartak Subotica (2022)–2023
 Diamantis Chouchoumis – (SRB) – Vojvodina 2018–2019
 Giannis Christopoulos – (CRO) – Slaven Belupo 2022–present
 Andreas Dermitzakis – (SRB) – Radnik Surdulica 2018–2019
 Dimitris Diamantakos – (CRO) – Hajduk Split 2020–2022
 Georgios Doulias – (MNE) – OFK Grbalj (2011)–2012
 Galanos – (Yug/SRB) – Obilić Belgrade 1942–1943
 Georgos Gemistos – (MNE) – Lovćen Cetinje 2016–2017
 Savvas Gentsoglou – (CRO) – Hajduk Split 2016–2018
 Charis Kostakis – (SVN) – Domžale 2012–2013
 Lefteris Matsoukas – (SRB) – Dinamo Vranje 2018–2019
 Charalampos Mavrias – (CRO) – Rijeka 2017–2018
 Nemanja Milojević – (SRB) – Čukarički Belgrade 2016–2018, Vojvodina 2018–2019, Voždovac 2020–2022, Kolubara 2022–present
 Panagiotis Moraitis – (MNE, BIH) – Budućnost Podgorica 2019–2021, Borac Banja Luka 2020–2022
 Dimitrios Papadopoulos – (CRO) – Dinamo Zagreb (2009)–2010
 Kyriakos Papadopoulos – (CRO) – Lokomotiva Zagreb 2020–2021
 Panagiotis Papadopoulos – (SVN) – Ankaran Hrvatini (2017)–2018
 Christos Rovas – (SVN) – Tabor Sežana 2020–2021
 Dimitris Toskas – (BIH) – Željezničar Sarajevo (2016)–2017
 Georgios Tsirlidis – (MKD) – Pelister Bitola 2014–2015
 Fanis Tzandaris – (SVN) – Koper 2016–(2017)
 Dimitrios Tzinovits – (SRB) – Proleter Novi Sad 2021–(2022)
 Andreas Vlachomitros – (SRB) – Javor Ivanjica (2016)–2017
 Michalis Zistakis – (Yug/SRB) – Jedinstvo Belgrade 1924–1925, Radnički Belgrade 1925–1926

Guadeloupe
 Thomas Phibel – (SRB) – Red Star Belgrade (2016)–2017

Guatemala
 Jorge Aparicio – (CRO) – Slaven Belupo (2018)–2019
 Wilber Pérez – (KOS) – Gjilani 2018–2019
 Cristian Trabanino – (MKD) – Milano Kumanovo 2009–(2010)

Guinea
 Mamadouba Bangoura – (MKD) – Shkupi 2020–(2021)
 Mohamed Malela Bangoura – (BIH) – Zvijezda 09 (2019)–2020
 Abdoulaye Cissé – (SRB) – Novi Pazar 2020–2021
 Lamin Diallo – (SVN, BIH) – Domžale 2010–2012, Triglav Kranj 2011–2014, Krka 2014–2015, Mladost Doboj Kakanj 2017–2019
 Faouly Keita – (MKD) – Shkupi 2019–2020
 Sekou Keita – (SRB) – Voždovac 2021–2022
 Moriba Tokpa Lamah – (KOS) – Trepça '89 2020–(2021), Dukagjini (2021)–2022
 Mathias Pogba  – (SVN) – Tabor Sežana 2020–(2021)
 Seydouba Soumah – (SRB) – Partizan Belgrade 2017–2018, 2019–2021
 Ibrahima Toure – (MNE) – Dečić Tuzi 2020–2021
 Kalla Toure – (SRB) – Sloboda Užice 2012–2013

Guinea-Bissau
 Aldair Baldé – (SVN) – Tabor Sežana 2020–2021, Olimpija Ljubljana 2021–present
 Bacar Baldé – (SRB) – Borac Čačak (2016)–2017
 Ednilson – (SRB) – Partizan Belgrade 2007–2008
 Helistano Manga – (KOS) – Ferizaj (2022)–2023
 Almami Moreira – (SRB) – Partizan Belgrade 2007–2011, Vojvodina 2011–2013

Haiti
 Christopher Attys – (CRO) – Šibenik 2021–2022

Honduras
 Ronald Agurcia – (MNE) – Dečić Tuzi 2011–2012
 Luis Garrido – (SRB) – Red Star Belgrade 2012–2013
 Roby Norales – (KOS) – Liria Prizren 2018–(2019)

Hong Kong
 Dejan Antonić – (Yug/SRB) – Spartak Subotica 1989–1990, Napredak Kruševac 1990–1992, Obilić Belgrade 1994–1995
 Alen Bajkuša – (BIH) – Željezničar Sarajevo 1992–1993, 2002–2003, Široki Brijeg 2003–2004
 Anto Grabo – (Yug/BIH, CRO) – Željezničar Sarajevo 1979–1984, 1988–1989, Dinamo Vinkovci 1984–1985

Hungary
 Eugen Ábrahám aka Saraz II – (Yug/SRB) – Vojvodina 1923–1924
 Jenő Ábrahám aka Saraz I – (Yug/SRB, CRO) – Vojvodina 1922–1925, Građanski Zagreb 1925–1927 (Yugoslav international)
 János Báki – (Yug/SRB) – Radnički Kragujevac 1945–1946
 András Ballai – (SVN) – Nafta Lendava 1992–1993
 Lajos Barna – (Yug/SRB) – Bačka Subotica 1939–1940
 Árpád Blau – (Yug/SRB) – BSK Belgrade 1920–1921
 Gyula Blau – (Yug/SRB) – SK Velika Srbija 1913–1914, Juda Makabi 1921–1923
 Bertalan Bocskay – (SRB) – TSC Bačka Topola 2021–present
 Ferenc Bódi – (Yug/SRB) – NAK Novi Sad 1937–1942
 János Borsó – (Yug/SRB) – Vojvodina 1985–1986
 Rajmond Breznik – (Yug/SRB) – Juda Makabi 1923–1924, NTK Novi Sad 1924–1925
 Krisztián Budovinszky – (CRO) – Slaven Belupo 2001–2002
 Ladiszlav Csányi – (Yug/SRB) – Vojvodina 1967–1969
 Csaba Csizmadia – (CRO) – Slaven Belupo (2009)–2010
 Pál Dárdai – (Yug/SRB) – Vojvodina 1985–1986
 Dezső – (Yug/SRB) – Vojvodina 1919–1920
 Kálmán Dobi – (Yug/SRB) – NAK Novi Sad 1924–1925
 Sándor Dudás – (Yug/SRB) – Vojvodina 1921–1926
 József Dzurják – (Yug/SRB) – Spartak Subotica 1990–1991
 Gyula Ellbogen – (Yug/SRB) – BSK Belgrade 1923–1924
 József Fábián – (Yug/SRB) – NAK Novi Sad (193x–194x)
 Pál Fischer – (CRO) – Osijek 1997–1998
 Márkó Futács – (CRO, SVN) – Hajduk Split 2016–2018, Olimpija Ljubljana (2021)–2022
 Miklós Gaál – (CRO) – Hajduk Split (2006)–2007
 István Gligor – (Yug/SRB) – OFK Belgrade 1973–1974
 Árpád Gőgös – (Yug/SRB) – NAK Novi Sad 193x–1937
 Ádám Gyurcsó – (CRO) – Hajduk Split 2017–2021, Osijek 2020–(2021)
 János Hajdú – (Yug/SRB) – NAK Novi Sad 1924–1925
 Nándor Hargitai – (Yug/SRB) – NAK Novi Sad 1940–1943
 Gyula Hegedűs – (Yug/SRB) – ŽAK Subotica 1935–1937
 Filip Holender – (SRB) – Partizan Belgrade 2020–2022
 Attila Horváth – (SVN) – Mura 2000–2001
 Gyula Horváth – (Yug/SRB) – NAK Novi Sad 1924–1925
 Róbert Horváth – (SVN) – Mura 1996–1998
 Sebestyén Ihrig-Farkas – (SVN) – ND Gorica (2013)–2014
 Ferenc Kalmár – (CRO) – Belišće 1994–1995, Zadar 1995–1996
 Jenő Kalmár – (Yug/SRB) – Radnički Belgrade 1945–1946
 János Karába – (Yug/SRB) – NAK Novi Sad 1936–1937
 Zsombor Kerekes – (SRB) – Bečej 1990–1996, Spartak Subotica 1996–1999
 László Kleinheisler – (CRO) – Osijek 2018–2023
 Gergely Kocsárdi – (SVN) – Nafta Lendava 2007–2008
 Adrián Kocsis – (SVN) – Nafta Lendava (2011)–2012
 Béla Koplárovics – (SVN) – Nafta Lendava (2009)–2010
 László Köteles – (SRB) – Železnik Belgrade 2002–2003
 Lajos Kovács – (Yug/SRB) – NAK Novi Sad 1937–1942
 Ede Krausz – (Yug/SRB) – SAND Subotica 1921–1923
 Bertalan Kun – (SRB) – Proleter Novi Sad 2021–2022
 József Lakatos – (Yug/SRB) – 14. Oktobar Niš 1946–1947
 Krisztián Lisztes – (CRO) – Hajduk Split (2007)–2008
 Gergő Lovrencsics – (CRO) – Hajduk Split 2021–present
 Ferenc Makó – (Yug/SRB) – Partizan Belgrade 195_–195_
 Zsolt Makra – (SVN) – Primorje 2007–2008
 Zsolt Máriási – (CRO) – Osijek 1997–1998
 Béla Mayer – (Yug/SRB) – Somborski SK 1923–1924
 Gábor Nagy – (CRO) – Zadar 1994–1996
 Tamás Nagy – (Yug/SRB) – Spartak Subotica 1990–1991
 Károly Nemes – (Yug/SRB) – NAK Novi Sad 1919–1924, Jugoslavija Belgrade 1924–1925
 István Nyers – (Yug/SRB) – ŽAK Subotica 1941–1945, Spartak Subotica 1945–1946
 Mario Onhaus – (SRB) – Hajduk Kula 1999–2000
 Sándor Peics – (Yug/SRB) – Vojvodina 1929–1930
 Ferenc Plattkó – (Yug/SRB) – KAFK Kula 1921–1922
 Roland Polareczki – (SVN) – Nafta Lendava (2011)–2012
 Zsolt Radics – (SRB, CRO) – Spartak Subotica 1998–2001, Osijek 2001–2005
 András Rózsa – (Yug/SRB) – ŽAK Kikinda 1935–1936
 József Rumos – (Yug/SRB) – NAK Novi Sad 193_–1941
 József Schaller – (Yug/SRB) – KAFK Kula 1924–1925
 Lajos Schönfeld aka Tusko – (Yug/SRB) – NAK Novi Sad 1918–1920, Vojvodina 1921–1922, BSK Belgrade 1922–1924
 József Sebök – (SVN) – Nafta Lendava 2007–2010
 Vilmos Sipos – (Yug/SRB, CRO) – Jugoslavija Belgrade 1930–1931, Građanski Zagreb 1932–1935, 1939–1940 (both Yugoslav and Hungarian international)
 Gyula Spitz – (Yug/SRB) – Partizan Belgrade 1946–1947
 Toni Szabó – (Yug/SRB, BIH) – BSK Belgrade 1921–1924, Slavija Sarajevo 192_–19__
 Sándor Szluha – (Yug/SRB) – Vojvodina 1939–1940, NAK Novi Sad 1940–1942
 Adrián Szőke – (SRB) – TSC Bačka Topola 2022–present
 Barnabás Sztipánovics – (CRO, SVN) – Rijeka 1998–2000, Maribor 2000–2002
 Tőrők – (Yug/SRB) – BSK Belgrade 1920–1921
 Ladiszlav Tőrők – (Yug/SVN) – Nafta Lendava 1946–1947
 Márk Ughy – (BIH) – Posušje 2000–2001, 2002–2003
 Florián Urban – (SRB) – Spartak Subotica 1999–2000
 Péter Vígh – (CRO) – Dinamo Zagreb 1991–1992
 Sándor Weisz – (Yug/SRB) – Juda Makabi 1921–1924, Vojvodina 1924–1925

Iceland
 Izudin Dervic – (Yug/SVN) – Olimpija 1989–1990

India
 Sandesh Jhingan – (CRO) – Šibenik (2021)–2022

Indonesia
 Miftah Anwar Sani – (BIH) – Sloboda Tuzla 2020–(2021)
 Ilija Spasojević – (SRB, MNE) – Vojvodina 2004–2005, Sutjeska Nikšić 2005–2006, Borac Čačak 2009–2010
 Witan Sulaeman – (SRB) – Radnik Surdulica 2019–2021

Iran
 Younes Delfi – (CRO) – HNK Gorica 2020–2022
 Amirhossein Hajiagha – (MKD) – Makedonija GP 2021–present
 Ali Karimi – (CRO) – Dinamo Zagreb (2016)–2017, Lokomotiva Zagreb 2016–(2017)
 Mohammad Mehdi Mehdikhani – (CRO) – Varaždin 2019–2021
 Sadegh Moharrami – (CRO) – Dinamo Zagreb 2018–2019, 2019–present, Lokomotiva Zagreb (2019)–2020
 Behnam Taherzadeh – (SVN) – Celje 1998–1999

Iraq
 Jiloan Hamad – (CRO) – HNK Gorica 2019–2021
 Abdullah Hameed – (SVN) – Tabor Sežana (2022)–2023
 Najm Shwan – (SVN) – Rudar Velenje 2017–2018
 Rebin Sulaka – (SRB) – Radnički Niš (2019)–2020

Israel
 Dudu Biton – (SVN) – Maribor (2014)–2015
 Saleem Favakhry – (MKD) – Pobeda Prilep 2022–present
 Roei Gordana – (CRO) – Slaven Belupo (2018)–2019
 Lior Inbrum – (SVN) – Maribor (2017)–2018
 Marwan Kabha – (SVN) – Maribor 2015–2018
 Jamal Khatib – (CRO) – Cibalia Vinkovci 2016–2017
 Bibras Natcho – (SRB) – Partizan Belgrade 2019–present
 Lior Nesher – (SVN) – Krško 2017–2018
 Sintayehu Sallalich – (SVN) – Maribor 2014–2017
 Idan Vered – (SRB) – Red Star Belgrade (2015)–2016
 Evgeniy Vinokorov – (SVN) – Mura 2021–(2022)

Italy
 Neat Abdulai – (MKD) – Akademija Pandev 2022–present
 Andrew Agnoletti – (SVN) – Tabor Sežana 2019–2021
 Alessandro Ahmetaj – (SVN) – Koper 2020–2021, ND Gorica 2022–present
 Christian Alessandria – (SVN) – Ankaran Hrvatini 2017–2018
 Riccardo Ammirati – (SVN) – Ankaran Hrvatini (2017)–2018
 Armando Anastasio – (CRO) – Rijeka (2020)–2021
 Gabriele Artistico – (CRO) – Lokomotiva Zagreb (2021)–2022
 Joseph Asante – (SVN) – ND Gorica (2020)–2021
 Daniele Bazzoffia – (SVN) – ND Gorica 2013–2014
 Luca Berardocco – (SVN) – ND Gorica 2013–2014
 Giovanni Bertotto – (Yug/SRB) – Jedinstvo Belgrade 1924–1925
 Kingsley Boateng – (SVN) – Olimpija Ljubljana 2016–2018
 Martin Boakye – (CRO) – Slaven Belupo (2020)–2021
 Matteo Boccaccini – (SVN, BIH) – ND Gorica 2014–(2015), Krka 2015–(2016), Željezničar Sarajevo 2016–2017
 Filippo Boniperti – (SVN) – ND Gorica 2013–2014
 Daniel Bradaschia – (SVN) – Koper 2012–2013, (2014)–2015
 Ivan Cacchioli – (SVN) – ND Gorica 2013–2014
 Alexander Caputo – (SVN) – ND Gorica 2014–2015
 Francesco Checcucci – (SVN) – ND Gorica (2013)–2014
 Gennaro Chietti – (SVN) – Drava Ptuj 2005–2006
 Mauro Cioffi – (MNE) – Berane 2014–(2015)
 Juri Cisotti – (CRO) – Rijeka (2015)–2016
 Massimo Coda – (SVN) – ND Gorica 2013–2014
 Alessio Codromaz – (SVN) – ND Gorica 2012–2014
 Godberg Cooper – (MKD) – Makedonija GP 2021–(2022)
 Alex Cordaz – (SVN) – ND Gorica 2013–2014
 Massimo Del Degan – (SVN) – ND Gorica (1997)–1998, Maribor 1997–(1998), Tabor Sežana 2000–2001, Triglav Kranj 2001–2002
 Felice Di Cecco – (SVN) – ND Gorica 2014–2015
 Gianluca Franciosi – (SVN) – ND Gorica 2016–2017
 Luigi Di Franco – (Yug/SRB) – Jedinstvo Belgrade 1937–1941, Jugoslavija Belgrade 1941–1942
 Dario Doz – (SVN) – ND Gorica 1992–1994
 Diego Falcinelli – (SRB) – Red Star Belgrade 2020–2021
 Filippo Falco – (SRB) – Red Star Belgrade 2020–2022
 Alessandro Favalli – (SVN) – ND Gorica 2013–2014
 Daniele Ferri – (SVN) – ND Gorica 2014–2015
 Francesco Finocchio – (SVN) – ND Gorica 2013–2014
 Marco Fossati – (CRO) – Hajduk Split 2020–present
 Alberto Gallinetta – (SVN) – ND Gorica 2014–2015
 Lorenzo Gazzari – (Yug/CRO) – Hajduk Split 1923–1928
 Otmar Gazzari – (Yug/CRO, SRB) – Hajduk Split 1921–1928, BSK Belgrade 1929–1933
 Aldo Giurini – (Yug/CRO) – Kvarner Rijeka 1952–1954, Lokomotiva Zagreb 1954–1955
 Hervé Mattia Gotter – (SVN) – Tabor Sežana 2021–2022
 Daniele Gragnoli – (SVN) – ND Gorica 2014–2015
 Giulio Grifoni – (MKD) – Akademija Pandev 2017–2018
 Loris Kikkri – (KOS) – Llapi (2020)–2021
 Fabio Lebran – (SVN) – ND Gorica (2013)–2014
 Emanuele Lirussi – (SVN, SRB) – Domžale 2004–2005, OFK Belgrade (2005)–2006
 Gabriel Lunetta – (CRO) – Rijeka 2022–present
 Antonio Martucci – (SVN) – ND Gorica 1992–1993
 Andrea Migliorini – (SVN) – Koper 2012–2013
 Gianvito Misuraca – (SVN) – ND Gorica 2013–2014
 Marco Modolo – (SVN) – ND Gorica 2013–2014
 Simone Napoli – (SVN) – ND Gorica 2014–2015
 Giacomo Nava – (KOS) – Llapi 2019–2021
 Luigi Palumbo – (SVN) – ND Gorica 2014–2015
 Lorenzo Pasqualini – (SVN) – ND Gorica 2014–2015
 Cristiano Piccini – (SRB) – Red Star Belgrade 2021–(2022)
 Mario Ravnich – (Yug/CRO) – Kvarner Rijeka 1946–1949
 Davide Restieri – (KOS) – Flamurtari Prishtina (2017)–2018
 Alberto Rosa Gastaldo – (CRO) – Istra 1961 2014–2015
 Franco Rosignoli – (Yug/SVN) – Maribor 1967–1971
 Giuseppe Ruggiero – (SVN) – ND Gorica 2014–2015 
 Said Ahmed Said – (CRO) – Hajduk Split 2016–2019
 Mattia Specogna – (SVN) – Tabor Sežana 2019–2021
 Gianpiero Tofoli – (SVN) – ND Gorica 1992–1993
 Rodolfo Tommasi – (Yug/SRB) – BSK Belgrade 1932–1933
 Filippo Tripi – (SVN) – NŠ Mura 2022–present
 Diego Vannucci – (CRO) – Rijeka (2012)–2013

Jamaica
 Ranaldo Biggs – (SVN) – Domžale 2021–present, ND Gorica (2022)–2023
 Shawn Brown – (BIH) – Travnik 2013–2014
 Warner Brown – (SVN) – NŠ Mura 2022–present
 Norman Campbell – (SRB) – Čukarički Belgrade 2021–2022, Javor Ivanjica 2022–present
 Renaldo Cephas – (MKD) – Shkupi 2022–present
 Cristojaye Daley – (SVN) – Koper 2021–2023
 Shamar Nicholson – (SVN) – Domžale 2017–2019
 Kaheem Parris – (SVN) – Domžale (2019)–2020, Koper 2021–2022

Japan
 Taisuke Akiyoshi – (BIH) – Zvijezda Gradačac 2013–2014
 Haruki Arai – (CRO) – Šibenik 2022–present
 Takuma Asano – (SRB) – Partizan Belgrade 2019–2021
 Masanobu Egawa – (MNE) – Sutjeska Nikšić 2016–2017
 Masato Fukui – (MNE) – Sutjeska Nikšić 2013–2015
 Eito Furuyama – (SVN) – Radomlje 2014–(2015)
 Kyosuke Goto – (MNE) – Mogren Budva 2014–2015, Iskra Danilovgrad 2015–2016
 Yuki Handa – (MNE) – OFK Grbalj 2013–2015
 Taichi Hara – (CRO) – Istra 1961 2020–(2021)
 Hiroki Harada – (MNE) – Rudar Pljevlja (2022)–2023
 Kento Hino – (MNE) – Kom Podgorica 2017–2019
 Matazou Hirano – (MNE) – Budućnost Podgorica 2013–2014
 Shataro Honna – (MNE) – Budućnost Podgorica 2014–2015
 Yu Horike – (MNE) – OFK Titograd 2019–(2020), Zeta (2021)–2022
 Ryosuke Iguchi – (MNE) – Kom Podgorica 2019–2020
 Masaki Iinuma – (MNE) – Mogren Budva 2014–2015, Sutjeska Nikšić (2015)–2016
 Takuo Ikeda – (MNE) – Bokelj Kotor 2014–2015
 Masahiko Inoha – (CRO) – Hajduk Split (2011)–2012
 Taku Ishihara – (MNE) – Mladost Podgorica 2012–2013
 Go Ito – (BIH) – Zvijezda Gradačac 2014–2015
 Takeshi Ito – (MNE) – OFK Grbalj 2012–2013
 Shuta Joboshi – (MNE) – OFK Petrovac 2015–2016
 Kohei Kato – (MNE) – Rudar Pljevlja 2013–2015, Iskra Danilovgrad 2019–2021, Podgorica 2020–(2021), Jezero Plav 2022–present
 Ryo Kato – (MNE) – Mladost Podgorica 2015–2016
 Takaya Kawanabe – (MNE, BIH) – Mladost Podgorica (2013)–2014, Rudar Prijedor 2013–2014
 Tonami Keito – (MNE) – Mladost Podgorica 2013–2014
 Takeru Komiya – (MNE) – Jezero Plav 2022–present
 Yuto Kubo – (SVN) – Celje 2014–(2015)
 Koken Kuroki – (MKD, KOS) – Mladost Carev Dvor (2015)–2016, Arbëria 2020–present
 Mitsusuke Maruyama – (SRB) – Hajduk Kula 2002–2003
 Yoshika Matsubara – (CRO) – Rijeka 1998–(1999)
 Hikaru Matsui – (MNE) – Rudar Pljevlja 2020–2021, 2021–(2022)
 Ryohei Michibuchi – (SRB) – Radnički Niš 2021–2023
 Takeshi Miki – (BIH) – Sloboda Tuzla 2011–(2012)
 Kazuyoshi Miura – (CRO) – Dinamo Zagreb 1998–1999
 Daisuke Miyata – (MNE) – Mornar Bar 2015–2016
 Ryohei Miyazaki – (SRB) – Bačka Bačka Palanka 2020–(2021)
 Taku Morinaga – (MNE) – Rudar Pljevlja 2018–2019
 Shingo Morita – (SRB) – Rad Belgrade 2003–2004
 Yasuyuki Moriyama – (SVN) – ND Gorica 1998–1999
 Takuya Murayama – (SRB) – Zemun 2018–2019
 Ryosuke Nagasawa – (SRB) – Radnički Niš 2021–(2022)
 Shoya Nakahara – (MNE) – Mornar Bar 2017–2018
 Shiden Nakazawa – (MNE) – Zeta 2021–2022
 Shodai Nishikawa – (MNE) – Rudar Pljevlja 2016–2017, OFK Petrovac 2017–2018
 Ryota Noma – (MNE, SRB) – Rudar Pljevlja 2013–2016, Radnički Niš 2016–2020
 Keisuke Ogawa – (SRB) – Sloboda Užice 2013–2014
 Iori Okamoto – (MNE) – Mornar Bar 2022–present
 Shohei Okuno – (SRB) – Sloboda Užice 2013–2014
 Masashi Otani – (MNE) – Mladost Podgorica 2016–(2017), Kom Podgorica 2017–2019
 Soma Otani – (MNE, BIH) – Berane (2013)–2014, 2014–2015, Slavija Sarajevo 2013–(2014)
 Yoshiki Otsuki – (MNE) – Rudar Pljevlja 2014–2015
 Naoaki Senaga – (MNE) – Jezero Plav 2022–present
 Arihiro Sentoku – (MNE, SRB) – Kom Podgorica 2017–2018, 2019–2020, Podgorica 2020–2022, Voždovac (2022)–2023, Iskra Danilovgrad 2022–present
 Shuhei Shimitsu – (MKD) – Mladost Carev Dvor (2015)–2016
 Masato Shimokawa – (MNE) – OFK Titograd 2020–(2021), Zeta (2021)–2022
 Noboru Shimura – (MNE, SRB) – Berane 2014–2015, Mornar Bar 2015–2016, Sutjeska Nikšić 2016–2017, Spartak Subotica 2017–2019, 2020–present
 Keita Suzuki – (MNE) – Podgorica 2019–2022
 Rio Suzuki – (BIH) – Borac Banja Luka (2017)–2018
 Takayuki Suzuki – (SRB) – Red Star Belgrade 2005–2007
 Ryo Tachibana – (MNE) – Zeta 2021–2022
 Ryoya Tachibana – (MNE) – OFK Petrovac 2018–2022
 Rion Taki – (MNE) – Bokelj Kotor 2016–2017
 Sōichirō Tanaka – (MNE) – Iskra Danilovgrad 2015–2016
 Kaoru Tanimoto – (MNE) – Rudar Pljevlja 2017–2018
 Ryuhei Tomita – (MNE) – Berane 2013–2014
 Yusaku Toyoshima – (MNE) – Lovćen Cetinje 2013–2014, Berane 2014–2015
 Kosuke Uchida – (MNE) – OFK Grbalj (2012)–2013, Bokelj Kotor 2013–2014
 Hirofumi Ueda – (MNE) – Lovćen Cetinje 2013–2016
 Itsuki Urata – (CRO) – Varaždin 2020–2021, 2022–present
 Hayato Wakino – (KOS) – Trepça 2016–2017
 Hidetoshi Wakui – (SVN) – Interblock 2005–2007, ND Gorica 2008–2009
 Hiroaki Yamamoto – (MNE) – Lovćen Cetinje (2016)–2017
 Sho Yamamoto – (MNE, SRB) – Rudar Pljevlja 2016–2017, OFK Petrovac 2017–2019, Spartak Subotica (2019)–2020, Iskra Danilovgrad 2019–2022
 Kenta Yamazaki – (MNE) – OFK Grbalj 2014–2015
 Takuto Yasuoka – (MNE) – Berane 2014–2015
 Shohei Yokoyama – (CRO) – Varaždin 2019–2020
 Eishun Yoshida – (BIH) – Željezničar Sarajevo 2012–2013
 Nobuyuki Zaizen – (CRO) – Rijeka 1998–(1999)

Jordan
 Ahmad Assaf – (BIH) – Mladost Doboj Kakanj (2019)–2020
 Amar El–Basti – (BIH) – Travnik (2012)–2013
 Anzour Nafash – (MNE) – Sutjeska Nikšić 2002–2003

Kazakhstan
 Nenad Erić – (SRB) – Radnički Kragujevac 2001–2002, OFK Belgrade 2003–2004, 2005–2006, Borac Čačak 2006–2008
 Maxim Fedin – (SRB) – Spartak Subotica 2014–2016
 Rinat Khayrullin – (MNE) – Jedinstvo Bijelo Polje (2016)–2017
 Bauyrzhan Turysbek – (SRB) – Radnički Niš (2014)–2015

Kenya
 Zablon Amanaka – (BIH) – Željezničar Sarajevo 2004–2006
 Haggai Leboo – (KOS) – Prishtina 2009–(2010)
 Wilkims Ochieng – (SVN) – Koper 2022–present
 Richard Odada – (SRB) – Red Star Belgrade 2020–2022, Metalac G.M. 2021–2022
 Tiellen Oguta – (KOS) – Drita Gjilan 2000–2001, Besiana 2001–2002

Korea DPR
 Hong Yong-jo – (SRB) – Bežanija 2007–2008
 So Hyon-uk – (BIH, SRB) – Zrinjski Mostar (2017)–2018, GOŠK Gabela 2017–(2018), Zemun (2018)–2019
 Yong Lee-ja – (SRB) – Napredak Kruševac (2009)–2010

Korea Republic
 Bae Beom-geun – (MKD) – Shkupi (2015)–2015
 Byeon Jae-min – (SRB) – Dinamo Vranje 2018–2019
 Byung Yun-cho – (KOS) – Prishtina 2015–2016
 Cho Ho-jun – (KOS) – Trepça 2014–2015
 Cho Yong-kyo – (SRB) – Mladost Apatin 2006–2007
 Chung Woon – (CRO) – Istra 1961 2012–2015, RNK Split 2015–2016
 Ha Sang-hyun – (SRB) – Radnički Obrenovac 2003–2005
 Hwang Jong-won – (SRB) – Rad Beograd 2016–2018
 Jang Je-un – (MNE) – Kom Podgorica (2019)–2020
 Jang Su-min – (SRB) – Borac Čačak 2016–2017
 Jung Dae-hyeon – (MNE) – OFK Titograd 2018–2019
 Kim Chan-woo – (SVN) – Bravo 2020–2021
 Kim Chi-woo – (SRB) – Partizan Belgrade 2004–2005
 Kim Do-hyun – (SVN) – Domžale 2019–2021, Aluminij 2020–2021
 Kim Gyu-hyeong – (CRO) – Istra 1961 (2020)–2021, Slaven Belupo 2020–(2021)
 Kim Ho-young – (MNE) – Mornar Bar 2013–2014
 Kim Hyun-woo – (CRO) – Dinamo Zagreb 2019–(2020), Istra 1961 (2020)–2021, Slaven Belupo 2020–(2021)
 Kim Jang-woon – (BIH) – Drina Zvornik 2014–2015
 Kim Jeong-hyun – (CRO) – Lokomotiva Zagreb 2020–present
 Kim Lae-kyun – (MNE) – OFK Grbalj (2015)–2016
 Kim Young-gyu – (CRO) – Istra 1961 2018–2019
 Kim Young-seop – (MNE) – Mornar Bar 2014–2016
 Koh Myong-jin – (CRO) – Slaven Belupo (2019)–2020
 Lee Hyunsso – (KOS) – Trepça 2014–2015
 Lee Hyung-joon – (MKD) – Rabotnički Skopje (2019)–2020
 Lee Hyung-sang – (CRO) – Šibenik (2010)–2011
 Lee Joon-soo – (MNE) – OFK Grbalj 2019–(2020)
 Lee Jung-yong – (CRO) – Slaven Belupo 2005–2006
 Lee Ki-hyun – (BIH) – Drina Zvornik (2014)–2015
 Lee San-hyeon – (SRB) – Bežanija 2007–2009
 Lee Sang-jin – (MNE) – Iskra Danilovgrad 2019–(2020)
 Lim Chang-jong – (MKD) – Rabotnički Skopje (2013)–2014
 Min Hong-sung – (CRO) – Istra 1961 2016–2017
 Min Kyong – (KOS) – Trepça 2014–2015
 Moon Tae-young – (BIH) – Leotar Trebinje 2013–(2014)
 Na Jin-sung – (CRO) – Istra 1961 2014–(2015)
 Park Chan-yong – (BIH) – GOŠK Gabela 2011–2012
 Park Dae-sung – (KOS) – Prishtina 2015–2016
 Park In-hyeok – (SVN, SRB) – Koper 2016–2017, Vojvodina (2017)–2018
 Park Ji-soo – (SRB) – Borac Čačak 2016–2017
 Park Tae-gyu – (SRB) – Bežanija 2007–2010, BSK Borča (2012)–2013
 Won Yeong – (KOS) – Trepça 2014–2015
 Woo Sang-ho – (MNE) – OFK Petrovac 2015–2016
 Yoon Seung-hyeon – (CRO) – Istra 1961 2013–(2014)

Kuwait
 Nasser Al Hajri – (BIH) – Borac Banja Luka 2010–(2011)

Kyrgyzstan
 Tamirlan Kozubaev – (SRB) – Jagodina 2015–(2016)
 Anton Zemlianukhin – (SRB) – Radnički Niš 2014–2016

Latvia
 Oļegs Baikovs – (MKD) – Vardar Skopje 2006–2007
 Oļegs Karavajevs – (Yug/SRB) – OFK Belgrade 1990–1993
 Jevgēņijs Kazačoks – (SRB) – Bačka Bačka Palanka 2020–(2021)
 Vitālijs Maksimenko – (SVN) – Olimpija Ljubljana 2018–2020, 2020–(2021)
 Anastasijs Mordatenko – (SRB) – Radnički Niš (2016)–2017
 Maris Verpakovskis – (CRO) – Hajduk Split 2007–2008
 Kaspars Svārups – (SRB) – Bačka Bačka Palanka 2020–(2021)

Lebanon
 Amir Hossari – (KOS) – Llapi 2020–(2021)
 Bassel Jradi – (CRO) – Hajduk Split 2018–2021

Liberia
 Joachim Adukor – (BIH) – Sarajevo 2017–2019, 2020–2021
 Joseph Aidoo – (KOS) – Llapi 2018–2019
 Nicholas Andrews – (KOS) – Feronikeli (2018)–2019, 2019–(2020), Drenica 2018–(2019)
 Jamal Arago – (KOS) – Gjilani 2015–(2016), Prishtina 2017–2020, Drita Gjilan 2020–2021
 Prince Balde – (KOS) – Feronikeli (2018)–2019, 2019–2021, Drenica 2018–(2019), Drita Gjilan 2021–2023
 Seku Conneh – (SRB) – Vojvodina 2018–2019
 Christian Essel – (SRB) – Radnički Kragujevac 2011–2012
 Patrick Gerhardt – (BIH) – Željezničar Sarajevo 2010–2012
 Van-Dave Harmon – (KOS) – Drenica (2019)–2020, Feronikeli 2019–(2020), Ballkani 2022–present
 Harrison Josiah – (MKD) – Sileks Kratovo 2005–(2006)
 Abu Kamara – (KOS, SVN, MKD) – Feronikeli 2016–(2017), Rudar Velenje 2017–2019, Dukagjini 2019–2021, Makedonija GP (2021)–2022
 Edmond Kingston – (CRO) – Zagreb 2002–2003
 Sylvanus Nimely – (CRO) – HNK Gorica 2020–(2021)
 Allen Njie – (CRO) – Slaven Belupo 2020–(2021)
 Mark Pabai – (SVN) – Tabor Sežana 2022–present
 Omega Roberts – (SRB, MNE) – Sloboda Užice 2011–2012, Smederevo 2012–2013, Red Star Belgrade (2013)–2014, Mladost Podgorica 2013–(2014), Borac Čačak (2014)–2015
 Mass Sarr – (CRO) – Hajduk Split 1995–1998
 Anthony Tokpah – (CRO) – Hajduk Split 1995–2000

Libya
 Zakaria Alharaish – (MNE) – Sutjeska Nikšić 2018–2019, 2021–(2022)
 Fahd T Saad Mohamed – (MNE) – Sutjeska Nikšić 2022–present
 Mohamed El Monir – (SRB) – Jagodina 2011–2014, Partizan Belgrade 2016–2018
 Mohamed Zubya – (SRB) – Partizan Belgrade 2012–2013

Liechtenstein
 Dennis Salanović – (CRO) – Istra 1961 2014–2016

Lithuania
 Domantas Antanavičius – (SVN) – Celje 2019–2022
 Karolis Chvedukas – (CRO) – RNK Split (2016)–2017
 Tomas Danilevičius – (SVN) – ND Gorica 2013–2014
 Paulius Golubickas – (CRO) – HNK Gorica 2019–2023
 Justas Lasickas – (SRB, SVN) – Zemun 2017–2018, Voždovac 2019–2022, Olimpija Ljubljana 2022–present
 Karolis Laukžemis – (CRO, SVN) – Istra 1961 2018–2020, Tabor Sežana 2019–(2020)
 Gražvydas Mikulėnas – (CRO) – Dinamo Zagreb 1999–2000
 Evaldas Razulis – (BIH) – Čelik Zenica (2007)–2008
 Daniel Romanovskij – (SRB) – Zemun 2018–2019
 Kęstutis Ruzgys – (Yug/SRB) – OFK Belgrade 1991–1992
 Domantas Šimkus – (SVN) – Mura 2022–present
 Vykintas Slivka – (SVN) – ND Gorica 2014–2015

Luxembourg
 Fahret Selimovic – (BIH) – Travnik 2015–2016
 Vahid Selimović – (SVN) – ND Gorica 2022–present

Malawi
 Mapemba Nqumayo – (SVN) – Koper 2006–2007

Mali
 Abdoulaye Camara – (SVN) – Koper 1997–1999
 Mademba Djibril Cissé – (SVN) – Koper 2015–(2016)
 Amadou Coulibaly – (BIH) – Tuzla City (2022)–2023
 Kalifa Coulibaly – (SRB) – Red Star Belgrade (2022)–2023
 Fousseni Diabaté – (SRB) – Partizan Belgrade 2022–present
 Alassane Diaby – (BIH) – Tuzla City 2022–present
 Guy Diassana – (MKD) – Makedonija GP 2016–2017
 Joseph Diassana – (MKD) – Makedonija GP 2016–2017
 Djibril Diawara – (KOS) – Trepça '89 2018–2021
 Kassim Doumbia – (SVN) – Maribor 2017–2018
 Tongo Doumbia – (CRO) – Dinamo Zagreb 2017–2018
 Manuel Kanté – (CRO) – Varteks 2009–(2010)
 Cheick Keita – (CRO) – HNK Gorica 2020–present
 Seydou Kone – (MKD) – Skopje 2022–present
 Amadou Sissoko – (MKD) – Makedonija GP 2016–2018
 Sambou Sissoko – (SRB) – Čukarički Belgrade 2022–present
 Hamidou Traoré – (SRB) – Partizan Belgrade 2022–present
 Lassine Traoré – (KOS) – Trepça '89 2019–2021, Prishtina (2020)–2021
 Mamadou Traoré – (SRB) – Vojvodina 2022–present
 Moha Traoré – (CRO) – Istra 1961 (2018)–2019
 Mahambe Tamboura – (MKD) – Škendija Tetovo 2011–(2012)
 Maharafa Tandina – (BIH, MKD) – Mladost Doboj Kakanj 2017–(2018), 2019–2020, Shkupi 2018–(2019)
 Abdoulaye Toungara – (KOS) – Liria Prizren 2017–(2018)
 Kalilou Traoré – (CRO) – Istra 1961 2008–2010

Malta
 Andrei Agius – (SRB) – Zemun 2003–2004
 Joseph Mbong – (CRO) – Inter Zaprešić 2016–(2017)
 Nenad Veselji – (Yug/SRB) – OFK Belgrade 1988–1994

Martinique
 Kévin Théophile-Catherine – (CRO) – Dinamo Zagreb 2018–present

Mauritania
 Lamine Ba – (CRO) – Varaždin 2022–present
 Abdoulaye Sileye Gaye – (MKD) – Renova 2009–2011
 Abdallahi Mahmoud – (CRO) – Istra 1961 2021–2022, 2022–present
 Ahmed M'Bareck – (KOS) – Besa Pejë 2020–(2021)
 Ethmane M'Heimar – (KOS) – Besa Pejë 2020–(2021)
 Bilal Taghiyoullah – (KOS) – Besa Pejë 2020–(2021)

Mexico
 Ricardo Alcalá – (BIH) – GOŠK Gabela (2012)–2013
 Hebert Alférez – (CRO) – Rijeka (2011)–2012
 Luis Delgadillo – (CRO) – Rijeka (2011)–2012
 Carlos Gutiérrez – (CRO) – Rijeka (2011)–2012
 Omar Novelo – (MKD) – Borec Veles 2021–(2022)
 Antonio Ramirez – (MNE) – Dečić Tuzi 2007–2008
 Francisco Rivera – (KOS) – Llapi 2021–present

Moldova
 Gheorghe Andronic – (CRO) – Dinamo Zagreb 2009–2011, Lokomotiva Zagreb 2009–(2010)
 Vitalie Bulat – (SRB) – Novi Pazar (2013)–2014, OFK Belgrade 2013–(2014)
 Mihail Caimacov – (CRO, SVN) – Osijek 2018–2021, Olimpija Ljubljana (2020)–2021, Koper 2020–(2021), Slaven Belupo 2021–present
 Iurie Iovu – (CRO) – Istra 1961 2022–present
 Vladislav Lungu – (SVN) – Celje 2000–2004, ND Gorica 2004–2005, Maribor 2006–2008
 Denis Marandici – (SVN, BIH) – Celje 2019–2022, Zrinjski Mostar (2022)–2023
 Stanislav Namașco – (SVN, MNE) – Domžale (2013)–2014, Dečić Tuzi 2017–(2018), Zeta 2018–2019
 Victor Şevcenco – (KOS) – Ballkani (2019)–2020

Morocco
 Yassine Benrahou – (CRO) – Hajduk Split 2022–present
 El Mehdi Daba – (KOS) – KEK-u Kastriot 2006–2008
 Oussama Zamouri – (CRO) – Inter Zaprešić 2019–2020

Mozambique
 Campira – (CRO) – Dinamo Zagreb 2005–2006
 Reginaldo Faife – (MKD) – Shkupi 2020–(2021)

Namibia
 Rudolph Bester – (SRB) – Čukarički Belgrade 2007–2009
 Eliphas Shivute – (SRB) – Čukarički Belgrade 2001–(2002)
 Hendrik Somaeb – (SRB) – Zemun 2018–2019

Netherlands
 Mitch Apau – (SVN, CRO) – Olimpija Ljubljana 2017–2018, Slaven Belupo 2020–(2021)
 Sead Begić – (BIH) – Olimpik Sarajevo 2015–2016
 Menno Bergsen – (SVN) – Maribor 2021–present
 Reda Boultam – (CRO) – Istra 1961 2022–present
 Tyrone Conraad – (MNE) – Sutjeska Nikšić 2022–present
 Cihat Çelik – (BIH) – Čelik Zenica 2017–2018
 Justin de Haas – (CRO) – Lokomotiva Zagreb 2021–present
 Lorenzo Ebecilio – (SRB) – Red Star Belgrade 2018–2019
 Giovanni Gravenbeek – (MNE) – Rudar Pljevlja (2017)–2018
 Serginho Greene – (SRB) – Vojvodina 2012–2013
 Dilivio Hoffman – (KOS) – Ballkani 2021–(2022)
 Aleksandar Janković – (SRB) – Radnički Kragujevac 2014–2015
 Rajiv van La Parra – (SRB) – Red Star Belgrade 2019–2020
 Simon Loshi – (KOS) – Feronikeli 2019–(2020), 2020–2022
 Justin Mathieu – (CRO) – HNK Gorica 2018–2020
 Queensy Menig – (SRB) – Partizan Belgrade 2021–present
 Yassin Nasser – (MKD) – Skopje 2021–(2022)
 Mink Peeters – (SRB) – Čukarički Belgrade (2019)–2020
 Đorđe Pupovac – (BIH) – NK Zvijezda Gradačac 2013–2015
 Terry Lartey Sanniez – (SVN) – Celje 2021–2022
 Matthew Steenvoorden – (CRO) – HNK Gorica 2019–present
 Joey Suk – (CRO) – HNK Gorica 2018–present
 Damian van Bruggen – (CRO, SVN) – Inter Zaprešić 2019–(2020), Slaven Belupo 2020–2022, Olimpija Ljubljana 2021–(2022)
 Bradley Vliet – (CRO) – Lokomotiva Zagreb 2019–2020
 Sergio Zijler – (CRO) – Rijeka 2010–(2011)
 Richairo Živković – (SRB) – Red Star Belgrade 2021–2022

New Zealand
 Adam Mitchell – (SRB, SVN) – Red Star Belgrade (2016)–2017, Celje 2016–(2017)

Niger
 Djibrilla Ibrahim – (CRO) – Rijeka 2022–present
 Adamou Moussa – (KOS) – Flamurtari Prishtina 2018–2019

Nigeria
 Michael Acibola – (MKD) – Pobeda Prilep 2004–(2005)
 Abdulrashid Adams – (MKD) – Sloga Jugomagnat 2004–2005
 Michael Adams – (MKD) – Madžari Solidarnost 2003–2004
 Samuel Adebare – (BIH) – Zrinjski Mostar 2008–2009
 Joseph Adeleke – (MKD) – Pobeda Prilep 2004–(2005)
 Ridvan Adeshina – (MKD) – Rabotnički Skopje (2016)–2017
 Sunday Adetunji – (MKD) – Shkupi 2021–present
 Abiodun Dayo Adeyoriju – (SRB) – Borac Čačak 2009–2010
 Sylejman Affez Afinde – (KOS) – Trepça '89 2014–2015
 Anthony Agha Ibiam – (SRB) – Javor Ivanjica 2008–2009
 Uche Agbo – (SRB) – Rad Belgrade 1995_–199_, Obilić Belgrade 1995–1997
 Victor Agbo – (BIH, MNE, SRB) – Rudar Ugljevik 2002–2005, OFK Grbalj 2006–2007, Jagodina 2010–2011
 Ovbokha Agboyi – (SVN) – Zavrč 2015–(2016), Bravo 2019–2021
 Donald Agu – (SRB) – Obilić Belgrade 1994–1995
 Simon Ajanah–Chinedu – (KOS) – OFK Titograd 1921–2020
 Goodness Ajayi – (CRO, BIH) – Rijeka 2013–2015, 2016–2017, Široki Brijeg 2015–2016, Inter Zaprešić 2018–2019
 Taiye Ajiye – (CRO) – Inter Zaprešić 2014–2017
 Nnaemeka Ajuru – (SRB) – Javor Ivanjica 2005–2009, 2014–2016, Vojvodina 2009–2013, Spartak Subotica 2016–2017
 Omande Akibene – (MKD) – Pobeda Prilep 2004–2005
 Adeleke Akinyemi – (KOS) – Trepça '89 2015–2016
 Uche Akubuike – (SRB) – Hajduk Kula 200_–200_
 Abraham Alechenwu – (MKD) – Vardar Skopje (2012)–2013
 Ibrahim Aliyu – (CRO) – Lokomotiva Zagreb 2020–present
 Mohammed Aliyu – (CRO) – Zadar 2014–2015, RNK Split 2016–2017, Istra 1961 2017–2018
 Victor Amos – (SRB) – Mladost Lučani 2018–2021
 Kevin Amuneke – (SRB) – Sloboda Užice 2013–(2014)
 Wale Amusan – (SVN, MKD) – Koper 2007–2009, Rabotnički Skopje 2010–2011
 Stanley Amuzie – (SVN) – Aluminij 2018–2019
 Favour Aniekan – (SVN) – Krka 2014–2016
 Blessing Anyanwu – (MKD) – Vardar Skopje 2000–2001, 2003–2005, Cementarnica 55 2001–2003
 Sodiq Atanda – (KOS) – Prishtina (2021)–2022
 Iyayi Atiemwen – (CRO) – HNK Gorica 2018–2019, 2021–(2022) Dinamo Zagreb 2019–2021, Lokomotiva Zagreb 2019–2020
 Chidozie Awaziem – (CRO) – Hajduk Split 2022–present
 Gabriel Awia – (MKD) – Sloga Jugomagnat 2004–2005, Škendija Tetovo 2005–2006
 Franklin Ayodele – (SRB) – Mladi Radnik 2009–2010
 Ikuepamitan Ayotunde – (CRO) – Rijeka (2016)–2017, 2017–2019
 Ayodeji Bamidele – (CRO) – Rijeka 2018–2019
 Paul Banney – (MKD) – Makedonija GP 2005–2006
 Moses Zambrang Barnabas – (CRO) – Šibenik 2022–present
 Mathew Boniface – (KOS) – Trepça '89 (2016)–2017
 Odi Chibueze – (KOS) – Liria Prizren 2016–2017, Trepça '89 (2017)–2018 Vëllaznimi Gjakova 2017–2019, Dukagjini 2021–present
 Sunday Chibuike Ibeji – (SVN) – Ljubljana 2004–2005, Celje 2005–2007, Domžale 2006–(2007), Koper 2007–2009
 Geoffrey Chinedu – (KOS, MKD, SRB) – Trepça '89 2016–(2017), Rabotnički Skopje 2017–2018, Radnički Kragujevac 2022–present
 Chukwudi Chukwuma – (MKD) – Pelister Bitola 2021–(2022)
 Eleanya Kelechi Collins – (MNE, SRB) – OFK Grbalj 2006–2007, Mladost Apatin 2007–2008
 Jamilu Collins – (CRO) – Rijeka 2012–2013, 2016–2017, Krka (2015)–2016, Istra 1961 (2016)–2017
 Amos Dadet – (MKD) – Pobeda Prilep 2022–present
 Michael Dagogo – (SRB) – Novi Pazar 2015–2016
 Abiola Dauda – (SRB) – Red Star Belgrade 2012–2014
 Chijoko Declan – (KOS) – Besiana 200_–200_
 Gerald Diyoke – (CRO, SVN) – Rijeka 2015–2017, 2018–(2019), Krško 2017–2018
 Eddy Dombraye – (SRB) – OFK Belgrade 2002–2003
 John Okoye Ebuka – (SRB) – Novi Pazar 2015–2016
 Donatus Edafe – (SVN) – ND Gorica 2016–2018
 Raphael Edereho – (KOS) – Prishtina 2004–2005
 Okosi Edhere – (SRB) – Bačka Bačka Palanka (2017)–2018
 Bright Edomwonyi – (SVN) – Koper 2022–present
 Samuel Eduok – (CRO) – Hajduk Split 2019–2023
 Frank Egharevba – (SRB) – Javor Ivanjica (2009)–2010
 Abdulrazak Ekpoki – (SVN) – Ljubljana 2004–2005, ND Gorica 2007–2008, Drava Ptuj 2009–2010
 Blessing Eleke – (SVN) – ND Gorica 2014–2015, Olimpija Ljubljana 2015–2017
 Chikwado Chukwu Elijah – (SVN) – Domžale 2021–2022
 Ifeanyi Emeghara – (SRB) – Partizan Belgrade 2004–2006
 Henry Emenalo – (KOS) – Drenica 2004–2005
 Patrick Friday Eze – (SRB) – Rad Belgrade (2013)–2014, Napredak Kruševac 2013–(2014), Mladost Lučani 2014–2015
 Ikechukwu Ezeh – (MNE, SRB) – Kom Podgorica 2008–2009, Napredak Kruševac (2009)–2010, Dečić Tuzi 2009–2011
 Adeshina Fatai – (BIH) – Željezničar Sarajevo 2021–(2022)
 Manji Gimsay – (SVN) – Tabor Sežana 2022–present
 Osa Guobadia – (MKD) – Makedonija GP 2008–2009, Vardar Skopje 2011–2013
 Ezekiel Henty – (SVN, CRO) – ND Gorica (2014)–2015, Olimpija Ljubljana 2014–2015, Osijek 2018–2019
 Bassey Howells – (SRB) – Spartak Subotica 2018–2019
 Lukman Hussein – (KOS) – Drenica 2022–present
 Stanley Ibe – (MKD) – Bregalnica Delčevo 2003–2004, Sloga Jugomagnat 2004–2005
 Bruno Ibeh – (SVN) – Domžale 2018–2019
 Timothy Idogbe – (SRB) – Napredak Kruševac 2009–(2010)
 Ifeanyi Igbodo – (SRB) – Javor Ivanjica 2002–2005
 Harmony Ikande – (BIH) – Sarajevo (2015)–2016
 Prince Ikpe Ekong – (SVN) – Koper 1995–1997
 Chukwubuikem Ikwuemesi – (SVN) – Celje 2022–present
 Lucky Isibor – (SVN) – Koper 1996–1997
 Victor Jideonwor – (SRB) – Javor Ivanjica 2006–2007
 Deji Joel – (KOS) – Liria Prizren 2017–2019
 Moses John – (SRB) – Zemun 2018–2019
 Otto John – (KOS) – Trepça '89 2015–2018, Prishtina 2020–2022, Dukagjini 2022–present
 Marshal Johnson – (SVN) – ND Gorica 2014–2016
 Muhammed Kabiru – (SVN) – Rijeka 2016–2017, Krka 2015–(2016)
 Adekunle Lukmon – (SRB, MKD) – Borac Čačak 2002–2005, Vlazrimi Kičevo 2005–2006, Pobeda Prilep 2006–2007, Rabotnički Skopje 2007–2008
 Stephen Makinwa – (SVN) – ND Gorica 2014–2015
 Oladipupo Martins – (SRB) – Partizan Belgrade 2003–2005
 Christian Mba – (KOS) – Trepça '89 (2022)–2023
 Jerry Mbakogu – (CRO) – Osijek 2019–2020
 Ibrahim Ali Moussa – (MKD, KOS) – Belasica 2004–2005, Cementarnica 55 (2005)–2006, Sileks Kratovo 2007–2008, Vardar Skopje 2008–2009, Gjilani 2009–2010
 Musa Muhammed – (BIH, CRO) – Željezničar Sarajevo 2016–2017, HNK Gorica 2018–2022, Sarajevo 2022–present
 Olabiran Muyiwa – (CRO) – HNK Gorica 2021–2022
 David Nazim – (SVN) – Ankaran Hrvatini (2017)–2018
 Chinwendu Nkama – (SVN) – Ankaran Hrvatini 2017–2018, ND Gorica 2020–2021, Aluminij 2021–2022
 Samuel Nnamani – (SRB) – Jagodina 2014–(2015)
 Solomon Nlemchukwu – (CRO) – Hrvatski Dragovoljac 2013–(2014)
 Abraham Nwankwo  – (SVN) – Domžale 2022–present
 David Nwolokor – (CRO, BIH, SVN) – Rijeka 2014–(2015), 2017–2018, 2019–2021, 2022–present, Vitez 2016–2017, Aluminij 2021–(2022)
 Omwuka Michel Nwoso – (KOS) – Trepça '89 2014–2015
 Samson Obagbemiro – (MNE) – Iskra Danilovgrad 2015–2016
 Erhun Obanor – (CRO) – Rudeš 2018–2019, Istra 1961 (2021)–2022
 Samuel Ebuka Obi – (SVN) – ND Gorica 2022–present
 Godfrey Oboabona – (CRO) – HNK Gorica 2018–2019
 Jonathan Endurance Odiri – (SVN) – Drava Ptuj 2006–2008
 Obiora Odita – (SRB) – Javor Ivanjica 2003–2005, 2006–2007, 2010–2011, 2011–2012, Partizan Belgrade 2005–2007, Voždovac 2014–2016, Mladost Lučani 2016–2021
 Ugochukwu Oduenyi – (SRB) – Javor Ivanjica 2022–present
 Nathan Oduwa – (SVN) – Olimpija Ljubljana 2016–2018
 Kingsley Ogbobe – (CRO) – Inter Zaprešić 2014–2015
 Ibezito Ogbonna – (MKD) – Vardar Skopje 2011–2012
 Chukwudi Ogbonnaya – (KOS) – Liria Prizren (2009)–2010
 John Ogu – (SVN) – Drava Ptuj 2006–2010
 Emeka Oguegbu – (SRB) – Javor Ivanjica 2010–2011
 Michael Ogungbaro – (SVN) – Bravo 2019–2020
 Eugene Obi Ohunta – (SVN) – Drava Ptuj 2006–2008
 Ikechukwu Ojukwu – (KOS) – Besiana 2004–2006
 Martins Okeke – (KOS) – Flamurtari Prishtina 2003–2004
 Obele Okeke Onyebuchi – (SRB) – Javor Ivanjica 2002–2003
 Aliyu Okechukwu – (CRO) – Zadar 2014–(2015), RNK Split 2016–2017, Istra 1961 (2017)–2018
 Eze Okeuhie – (SRB) – Vojvodina 2017–2019, Čukarički Belgrade 2019–2021
 Paschal Okoli – (BIH) – Čelik Zenica 2017–2018
 Samuel Okon – (SRB) – Dinamo Vranje 2018–2019
 Joseph Okonkwo – (KOS) – Vushtrria 2019–(2020), Trepça '89 2020–2021 
 Samuel Okwaraji – (Yug/CRO) – Dinamo Zagreb 1985–1986
 Solomon Oladele – (SRB) – Jagodina 2008–2009
 Peter Taiye Oladotun – (MNE) – Rudar Pljevlja 2007–2008
 Daniel Olerum – (SRB) – Sloboda Užice 2012–2013
 Emmanuel Oletu – (SRB) – Spartak Subotica 2008–2010
 Celestine Olisa – (MNE) – Jedinstvo Bijelo Polje 2004–2006
 Suleiman Omo – (MKD) – Pobeda Prilep 2004–2005
 Peter Omoduemuke – (SRB) – Obilić Belgrade 2004–2007
 Sunny Omoregie – (SVN) – Celje 2014–2016, Maribor 2016–2019
 Henry Austine Onoka – (KOS) – Drita Gjilan 2020–2022
 Emmanuel Onyebuchi – (MKD) – Shkupi 2018–2019
 Henry Onyilo – (SRB) – Javor Ivanjica (2013)–2014
 Ifeanyi Onyilo – (SRB) – Javor Ivanjica 2009–2013, Red Star Belgrade 2013–2014
 Joel Osikel – (SVN) – Triglav Kranj (2018)–2019
 Bede Osuji – (SVN) – ND Gorica 2013–2019, Koper 2021–present
 Abdulah Oyekanmi – (KOS) – Trepça '89 2022–present
 Mathias Oyewusi – (SVN) – ND Gorica 2020–2021
 Esosa Priestley – (KOS) – Drita Gjilan 2020–2022, Ulpiana 2021–(2022)
 Ishaq Rafiu – (SVN) – Maribor 2022–present
 Obisheran Rohmi – (KOS) – Trepça '89 2014–2015
 Umar Sadiq – (SRB) – Partizan Belgrade 2019–2020
 Gbolahan Salami – (SRB) – Red Star Belgrade 2014–(2015)
 Michael Sanni – (KOS) – Trepça '89 (2007)–2008, 2013–(2014)
 Okomayin Segun Onimisi – (MNE, SRB) – Zeta 2014–2016, Dinamo Vranje 2016–2020
 Jesse Sekidika – (SRB) – Napredak Kruševac 2015–2018
 Jero Shakpoke – (MKD, CRO) – Vardar Skopje 1996–1997, Rijeka 1997–1998
 Theophilus Solomon – (CRO, SRB, KOS) – Zadar 2014–2015, Istra 1961 2016–2017, Partizan Belgrade (2017)–2018, Inter Zaprešić 2018–2019, Ballkani 2021–2022, Gjilani 2022–present
 Ben Sunday – (MNE) – OFK Grbalj 2008–2009
 Olatunde Sundajtudafew – (KOS) – Trepça '89 2014–2015
 Alloden Ahmed Tovola – (KOS) – Trepça '89 2014–2015
 Nwankwo Tochukwu – (SVN) – Koper 2007–2009
 Obinna Tochukwu – (SRB) – Javor Ivanjica 2015–2016
 Anoruo Uche – (BIH) – Zrinjski Mostar (2019)–2020
 Ikouwem Udo – (CRO) – Slaven Belupo 2021–2022
 Godwin Udoh – (CRO) – HNK Gorica 2018–(2019)
 Collins Chinemerem Ugwueze – (SVN) – Domžale 2021–2022
 Ugo Ukah – (SRB) – Čukarički Belgrade 2014–2015
 Hogan Ukpa – (MKD) – Struga 2022–present
 Chuma Uruozo – (KOS) – Liria Prizren (2009)–2010
 Ejike Uzoenyi – (BIH, MNE) – Zvijezda 09 2019–(2020), OFK Titograd 2020–2021
 Eke Uzoma – (SRB) – Spartak Subotica (2015)–2016
 Sistus Uzoma – (MNE) – OFK Grbalj (2010)–2011
 Alma Wakili – (MKD) – Škendija Tetovo 2017–2018
 Taribo West – (SRB) – Partizan Belgrade 2002–2004
 Abdoulrazak Yakubu – (MKD) – Baškimi Kumanovo 2007–2008
 Abdulrashid Ola Yusuf – (SVN) – Bela Krajina 2005–2007
 Abdulkadir Zango – (MKD) – Shkupi 2018–2019
 Abdul Zubairu – (BIH, SRB) – Zrinjski Mostar (2022)–2023, Kolubara 2022–present

Norway
 Chuma Anene – (MKD) – Rabotnički Skopje 2014–2015
 Nentor Dujaka – (KOS) – Vëllaznimi Gjakova 2008–2010
 Agami Hando – (MNE) – Dečić Tuzi (2017)–2018
 Adi Markovic – (BIH) – Čelik Zenica 2018–2019
 Eman Markovic – (BIH) – Zrinjski Mostar 2018–2019
 Samuel Narh – (KOS) – Drenica 2021–present
 Moussa Njie – (SRB) – Partizan Belgrade 2018–(2019)
 Ohi Omoijuanfo – (SRB) – Red Star Belgrade 2021–(2022)

Oman
 Faisal Al-Harthi – (KOS) – Prishtina 2022–present

Palestine
 Mohammed Al-Kayed – (KOS) – Trepça '89 2017–2018
 Javier Cohene – (SRB) – Borac Čačak 2014–2015
 Mohamed Darwish – (KOS) – Trepça '89 2020–2021
 Jaka Ihbeisheh – (SVN) – Interblock (2006)–2007, Primorje 2010–2011, Rudar Velenje (2011)–2012, 2015–2016, Domžale 2011–2013, Krka 2013–2015, Bravo 2019–2020, Radomlje (2021)–2022

Panama
 Jorman Aguilar – (SVN, CRO) – ND Gorica (2013)–2014, Istra 1961 2013–(2014)
 Abdiel Arroyo – (CRO) – RNK Split 2015–(2016)
 Ricardo Ávila – (SVN) – Koper (2016)–2017
 Yoel Bárcenas – (CRO) – RNK Split 2015–(2016)
 José Luis Rodríguez – (CRO) – Istra 1961 2018–2019

Paraguay
 Milcíades Arrúa – (MKD) – Bregalnica Delčevo 2003–2004
 Diego Barrios – (CRO, SVN) – Osijek (2008)–2009, Domžale 2008–(2009)
 Emmanuel Fernández – (CRO) – Inter Zaprešić 2009–2010
 Carlos León – (BIH) – Čelik Zenica 2019–2020
 Diego Santa Cruz – (CRO) – Zadar 2004–2005
 Pedro Velázquez – (MNE) – OFK Petrovac (2015)–2016

Peru
 Miguel Araujo – (SRB) – Red Star Belgrade 2013–2014
 Iván Bulos – (CRO) – Hajduk Split (2019)–2020
 Rodolfo Burger – (MNE) – Zeta 2014–(2015)
 Camilo Jiménez – (MNE) – Zeta 2014–(2015)
 Gianluca Lapadula – (SVN) – ND Gorica 2013–2014
 Jhonny Vidales – (SVN) – ND Gorica 2013–(2014)

Philippines
 Diego Bardanca – (SRB, SVN) – Inđija (2019)–2020, ND Gorica (2020)–2021

Poland
 Grzegorz Bronowicki – (SRB) – Red Star Belgrade 2007–2009
 Jeremiah Dąbrowski – (SRB) – Mladost Lučani 2014–2015
 Marcin Garuch – (MNE) – OFK Grbalj 2016–2017
 Damian Kądzior – (CRO) – Dinamo Zagreb 2018–2020
 Michał Masłowski – (CRO) – HNK Gorica 2018–2020
 Łukasz Mierzejewski – (CRO) – Rijeka 2012–2013
 Krystian Nowak – (CRO) – Slaven Belupo 2018–2020
 Dawid Pietrzkiewicz – (SVN) – Primorje (2010)–2011
 Tomasz Rząsa – (SRB) – Partizan Belgrade 2003–2004
 Grzegorz Sandomierski – (CRO) – Dinamo Zagreb 2013–2014
 Franciszek Sikora – (Yug/SRB) – BSK Belgrade 1924–1925
 Mariusz Soska – (SVN) – Drava Ptuj 2006–2008
 Jacek Deniz Troshupa – (KOS) – Hajvalia 2014–2015, Feronikeli 2016–2017; 2018–2020
 Mateusz Zachara – (BIH) – Široki Brijeg 2020–(2021)
 Łukasz Zwoliński – (CRO) – HNK Gorica 2018–2020

Portugal
 Hugo Almeida – (CRO) – Hajduk Split 2017–2018
 Cristiano Alves – (BIH) – Olimpik Sarajevo 2014–2015
 Ricardo Alves – (SVN) – Olimpija Ljubljana 2015–2018
 Andrezinho – (SRB) – Spartak Subotica 2019–2020
 Vítor Bastos – (CRO) – Istra 1961 2014–2015
 Bonifácio – (MKD) – Vardar Skopje 2012–2013
 João Caminata – (MKD) – Mladost Carev Dvor 2015–(2016)
 Chiquinho – (CRO) – Lokomotiva Zagreb 2016–2017
 Henry Crinacoba – (SVN) – Tabor Sežana 2022–present
 Henrique Dinis – (CRO) – Istra 1961 2014–2016
 Eduardo – (CRO) – Dinamo Zagreb 2014–2016
 João Escoval – (CRO) – Istra 1961 (2017)–2018, Rijeka 2018–2022
 Filipe Ferreira – (CRO) – Istra 1961 (2017)–2018
 Ferro – (CRO) – Hajduk Split 2021–(2022), 2022–present
 Paulino Gomes – (CRO) – Rijeka 2000–2001
 Diogo Izata – (SVN) – Koper 2021–(2022)
 Dani Ladeira – (MKD) – Mladost Carev Dvor 2015–(2016)
 Ruben Lima – (CRO) – Hajduk Split 2011–2013, Dinamo Zagreb 2013–2014, Rijeka (2014)–2015
 João Lucas – (SRB) – Red Star Belgrade 2007–2008
 Jucie Lupeta – (SVN) – Celje 2016–2018, Olimpija Ljubljana 2018–2020
 Paulo Machado – (CRO) – Dinamo Zagreb 2014–2017
 Oscar Mendes – (KOS) – Flamurtari Prishtina 2017–2019
 Rui Pedro – (SVN) – Olimpija Ljubljana 2022–present
 Samuel Pedro – (SVN) – Olimpija Ljubljana (2022)–2023
 Rafa Pereira – (CRO) – Varaždin 2022–present
 Ivo Pinto – (CRO) – Dinamo Zagreb 2013–2016, 2019–2020
 Jorge Rodrigues – (SVN) – ND Gorica 2008–2009
 Sandro Sakho – (MKD) – Akademija Pandev 2022–present
 Marcelo Santiago – (SRB) – Jagodina (2012)–2013
 Gonçalo Santos – (CRO) – Dinamo Zagreb 2014–2017
 João Silva – (CRO) – Istra 1961 2020–2022
 Érico Sousa – (SVN) – Celje 2015–2016
 Ricardo Sousa – (SVN) – Drava Ptuj (2009)–2010
 David Sualehe – (SVN) – Olimpija Ljubljana 2022–present
 Jorge Teixeira – (KOS) – Gjilani 2016–2017
 Tomané – (SRB) – Red Star Belgrade 2019–2020
 Tonel – (CRO) – Dinamo Zagreb 2010–2013
 Danilo Veiga – (CRO) – Rijeka 2022–present
 Hugo Vieira – (SRB) – Red Star Belgrade 2015–2017
 Xavi – (SVN) – Drava Ptuj 2008–2009

Romania
 Florin Achim – (MKD) – Bregalnica Štip (2016)–2017
 Barna Antal – (SRB) – TSC Bačka Topola (2019)–2020
 Marcel Bǎban – (CRO) – Zadar 1997–1998
 Radu Banc – (Yug/SRB) – Proleter Zrenjanin 1971–1974
 Miodrag Belodedici – (Yug/SRB) – Red Star Belgrade 1989–1992
 Andrei Blejdea – (SVN) – Domžale 2014–2015
 Laurențiu Brănescu – (CRO) – HNK Gorica 2018–2019
 Florin Burcea – (SVN) – Celje 2014–2015
 Cristian Buturuga – (SVN) – Celje 1998–2000
 Robert Căruță – (MKD) – Bregalnica Štip (2016)–2017
 Florin Cernat – (CRO) – Hajduk Split 2007–2008, 2009–2010
 Ioan Răzvan Chiriţă – (SRB) – Radnički Kragujevac 2000–2002
 Sorin Colceag – (CRO) – Zagreb 1996–1998, 1999–2000
 Alexandru Crețu – (SVN) – Olimpija Ljubljana 2016–2017, Maribor 2017–2021
 Ronaldo Deaconu – (CRO) – HNK Gorica 2018–2019
 Lucian Dronca – (CRO) – Osijek 1996–1997, Istra Pula 1997–1998
 Gabriel Enache – (SRB) – Partizan Belgrade 2018–2019
 Steliano Filip – (CRO) – Hajduk Split 2017–2019
 Aurel Han – (Yug/SRB) – Spartak Subotica 1991–1992
 Roberto Iulian Ivan – (SVN) – Beltinci 1999–2000
 Jozef Kezdi – (Yug/SRB) – Jedinstvo Belgrade 1937–1938
 Gabi Kovács – (Yug/SRB) – Juda Makabi 1923–1924
 Dezideriu Laki – (Yug/SRB) – BSK Belgrade 1924–1925
 Nicolae Mǎnǎilǎ – (CRO) – Osijek 199_199_
 Cosmin Matei – (CRO) – Istra 1961 2017–2018
 Florentin Matei – (CRO) – Rijeka 2015–2018
 Alexandru Mățel – (CRO) – Dinamo Zagreb 2014–2019
 Dumitru Mitu – (CRO) – Osijek 1996–2002, Dinamo Zagreb 2002–2004, 2005–2006, Rijeka 2004–2005
 Teodor Mogin – (Yug/SRB) – Vojvodina 1924–1925
 Remus Mureşan – (CRO) – Primorac 1929 1995–1996
 Cristian Muscalu – (BIH, SRB) – Slavija Sarajevo 2008–(2009), Borac Čačak 2010–(2011), Voždovac (2013)–2014
 Nicu Nastase – (BIH) – Bosna Visoko 1999–2000
 Constantin Nica – (SRB) – Vojvodina 2019–(2020)
 Marinel Pascu – (SRB, CRO) – OFK Belgrade 2001–2002, Marsonia 2003–2004
 Constantin Păunescu – (SVN) – Domžale 2008–2009
 Vasile Păunescu – (Yug/SRB) – 14. Oktobar Niš 1946–1947
 Branimir Pavlov – (SRB) – OFK Kikinda (1992)–1993
 Iulian Popan – (Yug/SRB) – Juda Makabi 1923–1924
 Lucian Popescu – (CRO, SVN) – Osijek 1995–1997, 2000–(2001), Mladost 127 1997–1999, Beltinci 1999–2000, Korotan Prevalje 2000–2002, Triglav Kranj 2001–(2002)
 Virgil Popescu – (Yug/SRB) – Vojvodina 1938–1941, SAP Vojvodina 1945, Partizan Belgrade 1946–1948
 Svetozar Popovici – (Yug/SRB) – BSK Belgrade 1920–1925
 Iosif Rotariu – (SRB) – OFK Kikinda (1996)–1997
 Marius Sasu – (SRB) – Vojvodina 1997–1998
 Alin Stoica – (SRB) – Vojvodina 2009–2010
 Dacian Varga – (MKD) – Bregalnica Štip (2016)–2017
 Sorin Vlaicu – (SRB) – Red Star Belgrade 1992–1993
 Rudolf Wetzer – (Yug/SRB) – BSK Belgrade 1924–1925

Russia
 Layonel Adams – (MNE) – Budućnost Podgorica (2022)–2023
 Mirza Alborov – (MNE) – Mornar Bar 2007-2009
 Andrei Alenichev – (CRO) – Slavonija Požega 1995–1996
 Pavel Baranov – (BIH) – Sloga Meridian 2022–present
 Leonid Bayer – (Yug/SRB) – BASK Belgrade 1940–1942
 Fyodor Boltunov – (MNE) – Dečić Tuzi (2010)–2011
 Georgiy Bratukhin – (SRB) – Voždovac 2020–2021
 Daniil Chalov – (SRB) – Inđija 2020–(2021)
 Rashid Chichba – (BIH) – Leotar Trebinje 2021–(2022)
 Dzhamal Dibirgadzhiev – (MKD) – Shkupi (2020)–2021
 Tamirlan Dzhamalutdinov – (BIH, SRB) – Čelik Zenica 2019–(2020), Novi Pazar (2021)–2022
 Asteri Filaktov – (Yug/SRB) – OFK Belgrade 1963–1964
 Igor Gavrilov – (CRO) – Slavonija Požega 1995–1996
 Ilya Guchmazov – (BIH) – Sloga Meridian 2022–present
 Ramazan Isaev – (SRB) – Radnički Niš (2016)–2017
 Vladimir Isayev – (SVN) – Mura 1993–1994
 Lyubomir Kantonistov – (SVN) – Olimpija (2001)–2002
 Khasan Khatsukov – (MNE) – Jedinstvo Bijelo Polje 2016–2017
 Mikhail Khlebalin – (SVN, CRO) – Mura 1995–1996, Varteks 1996–1999
 Vladimir Kirsanov – (Yug/MNE) – Lovćen Cetinje 1920–1925
 Anton Kolobov – (BIH) – Željezničar Sarajevo (2010)–2011
 Ivan Konovalov – (SRB) – Radnički Niš 2015–2016, Bačka Bačka Palanka 2016–2017
 Kirill Kosarev – (CRO) – Hrvatski Dragovoljac (2021)–2022
 Mikhail Kostil – (CRO) – Croatia Sesvete 2009–(2010)
 Uchuk Kuldinov – (Yug/SRB) – Jedinstvo Belgrade 193_–1933, Jugoslavija Belgrade 1933–1937
 Murad Kurbanov – (BIH) – Metalleghe Jajce 2016–2017
 Daur Kvekveskiri – (SRB) – Napredak Kruševac 2016–2017
 Shabat Logua – (SRB) – Bačka Bačka Palanka 2019–2021, Zlatibor Čajetina 2020–(2021)
 Maksim Maksimov – (MKD, SRB) – Vardar Skopje 2017–2019, Napredak Kruševac (2020)–2021
 Maksim Martusevich – (SRB) – Javor Ivanjica 2015–2016
 Vladimir Medvedev – (SVN) – Beltinci 1993–1994
 Mikhail Merkulov – (CRO) – Rijeka 2021–present
 Aleksandr Mineyev – (MKD) – Cementarnica 55 2005–(2006), Bregalnica Štip 2006–2007
 Grigori Morozov – (SVN) – Celje 2021–present
 Aleksei Nikitin – (BIH) – Tuzla City 2022–present
 Teodor Nikolnikov – (Yug/CRO) – Bata Borovo (193x–194x)
 Sergei Neyman – (SVN, CRO) – Beltinci 1993–1997, Zadar 1997–1999
 Moris Nusuyev – (SVN) – Celje (2018)–2019
 Vladislav Oslonovsky – (CRO, MKD) – Istra 1961 (2014)–2015, Teteks Tetovo 2014–(2015)
 Vasili Pavlov – (MKD) – Teteks Tetovo 2014–(2015)
 Alan Prudnikov – (MKD) – Cementarnica 55 2005–2006
 Aleksei Prudnikov – (Yug/BIH) – Velež Mostar (1990)–1991, Sarajevo 1990–1992
 Yegor Prutsev – (SRB) – Red Star Belgrade 2022–present
 Anton Pushin – (Yug/SRB) – Jugoslavija Belgrade 1936–1937
 Dmitri Radchenko – (CRO) – Hajduk Split 2001–2002
 Artur Sagitov – (SRB) – Radnički Niš 2021–(2022)
 Schegolev – (Yug/SRB) – RFK Novi Sad 1962–1963
 Serder Serderov – (CRO) – Inter Zaprešić 2018–2020, Istra 1961 2021–2022
 Semen Sheptitskiy – (SRB) – Rad Belgrade 2018–2019
 Georgi Shishlov – (Yug/SRB) – Mačva Šabac 1924–1925
 Nikolai Simeonov – (Yug/SRB) – Vojvodina 1923–1924
 German Slepnyev – (SVN) – Triglav Kranj 1992–1993
 Andrey Sorokin – (SRB) – Spartak Suborica 2020–2021
 Vsevolod Stashevskiy – (Yug/SRB) – BSK Belgrade 1924–1925
 Valeri Sukhov – (SVN) – Mura 1993–1994
 Aleksandr Tatarkin – (CRO) – Istra Pula 1992–1993
 Eduard Toguzov – (BIH) – Željezničar Sarajevo 2001–2003, 2003–2004, Olimpik Sarajevo 2002–(2003)
 Sandro Tsveiba – (CRO) – Osijek (2015)–2016
 Sergei Vitvinskiy – (Yug/SRB) – Vojvodina 1922–1924
 Aleksandr Vorobyov – (SVN) – Triglav Kranj 1991–1994, Beltinci 1994–1995, 1999–2000, ND Gorica 1995–1997
 Veiz Yangurazov – (SVN) – Beltinci 1993–1995
 Vladislav Yefimov – (SRB) – Sartid Smederevo 1999–2001
 Ivan Yenin – (BIH) – Široki Brijeg 2018–2020, Zrinjski Mostar 2020–2021
 Aleksandr Yushin – (MKD) – Teteks Tetovo 2014–(2015)
 Valentin Zekhov – (SVN) – Celje 2019–2021

Rwanda
 Andre Lomami – (MKD) – Škendija Tetovo (2010)–2011
 Abdul Rwatubyaye – (MKD) – Shkupi 2020–2022

Saint-Martin
 Mickaël Mazzoli – (BIH) – Slavija Sarajevo (2011)–2012

Saudi Arabia
 Ibrahim Al-Ibrahim – (BIH, CRO) – GOŠK Gabela 2011–(2012), Inter Zaprešić (2012)–2013
 Jamal Bajandouh – (CRO) – Varaždin 2019–2020

Scotland
 Ryan Thomson – (CRO) – Hajduk Split 2003–2004

Senegal
 Sall Aboubakrine – (MKD) – Shkupi 2019–2020
 Pape Assane – (CRO) – Lokomotiva Zagreb 2019–2021
 Badara Badji – (CRO, SRB, BIH, MNE) – Dinamo Zagreb 2015–2016, Mladost Lučani 2017–2018, Zvijezda 09 (2019)–2020, Tuzla City 2019–2021, Mornar Bar (2021)–2022
 Yves Baraye – (SRB) – Vojvodina 2022–present
 Bara Bebeto – (KOS) – Ulpiana 2021–(2022)
 Albert Bougazelli – (MKD) – Shkupi 2020–(2021)
 Dominique Correia – (MNE) – Lovćen Cetinje 2016–2017, Budućnost Podgorica 2017–2019
 Mamadou Danfa – (MKD) – Shkupi 2021–(2022)
 Moussa Diabang – (BIH) – Zvijezda Gradačac 2009–2010
 Lamine Diack – (MKD) – Shkupi 2019–present
 Abdou Diakhaté – (SVN) – ND Gorica 2020–2021
 Boubacar Dialiba – (BIH) – Željezničar Sarajevo 2005–2008
 Lamine Diarra – (BIH, SRB) – Zrinjski Mostar 2005–2007, Partizan Belgrade 2007–2010, 2011–2012
 Secouba Diatta – (BIH) – Sarajevo 2011–2012, Zvijezda Gradačac 2012–2015, Željezničar Sarajevo (2015)–2016
 Younouss Diatta – (BIH) – Željezničar Sarajevo 2005–2007
 Albert Diène – (MKD) – Shkupi 2022–present
 Cheikhou Dieng – (SRB) – Spartak Subotica 2017–2018
 Matar Dieye – (CRO) – HNK Gorica 2020–2022
 Moustapha Diop – (MKD) – Škendija Tetovo (2007)–2008
 Papa Birane Fall – (MKD) – Škendija Tetovo (2007)–2008
 Ibrahima Fofana – (KOS) – Vushtrria 2015–2016
 Oumar Goudiaby – (MKD) – Shkupi 2019–2021, Pelister Bitola 2020–(2021)
 Ibrahima Gueye – (SRB) – Red Star Belgrade 2006–2009, Radnički Niš 2013–(2014)
 Youssou Lo – (SVN) – Celje 2012–(2013)
 Malick Mané – (KOS) – Drenica 2021–present
 Moussa Marone – (BIH) – Čelik Zenica 2018–2019
 Momo Mbaye – (CRO) – Inter Zaprešić 2018–(2019)
 Mamadou Mbodj – (SRB) – Napredak Kruševac (2014)–2015, Red Star Belgrade 2014–2016
 Jean Mendy Cabaye – (MKD) – Gorno Lisiče 2013–2014
 Mamadou Mendy – (MNE) – OFK Titograd 2017–2021, Jezero Plav 2020–2022, OFK Petrovac 2022–present
 Edgard Ali Natrantg – (MKD) – Shkupi 2021–present, Pelister Bitola 2021–(2022)
 Cherif Ndiaye – (CRO) – HNK Gorica 2019–2021
 Ibrahima Mame N'Diaye – (SRB) – Napredak Kruševac 2012–2017, 2017–2019, Čukarički Belgrade 2019–2021, 2021–present
 Mouhamadou N'Diaye – (KOS) – Hajvalia 2013–2014
 Ousseynou N'Diaye – (SVN) – Domžale (2015)–2016
 Welle N'Diaye – (SVN) – ND Gorica 2010–2014, Maribor 2014–2016
 El Hadji Ndong – (KOS) – Hajvalia 2013–2014
 Ibrahima N'Doye – (CRO) – Inter Zaprešić 2010–2011
 Arona Sané – (CRO) – Istra 1961 2018–2021
 Seydou Bocar Seck – (SRB) – Dinamo Vranje 2018–2020
 Ibrahima Sene – (KOS) – Vushtrria (2015)–2016
 Faustin Senghor – (BIH, MKD) – Čelik Zenica (2018)–2019, Shkupi 2020–2022
 Barry Mouhamadou Souahib – (MKD) – Shkupi 2021–present, Renova 2021–(2022)
 Pape Youssuf Sow – (MKD) – Škendija Tetovo (2007)–2008
 Insa Sylla – (MKD) – Rabotnički Skopje 2013–2014
 Lamine Tall – (SVN) – Olimpija Ljubljana 2021–2022
 Pape Samba Thiam – (SVN) – Radomlje 2022–present
 Thierno Thioub – (SRB) – Novi Pazar 2021–(2022)
 Mamadou Touré – (KOS) – Vushtrria 2015–2016
 Moussa Wagué – (CRO) – HNK Gorica (2022)–2023

Sierra Leone
 Mustapha Bangura – (SRB) – Borac Čačak 2015–(2016)
 Thomas Issa – (BIH) – Žepče 2005–2006
 Abu Kanu – (CRO) – Slaven Belupo 1997–1999
 Kelfala Marah – (SRB) – Čukarički Belgrade 2003–2005
 Medo – (SRB) – Partizan Belgrade 2010–2013
 Rodney Michael – (MNE) – Mornar Bar 2022–present
 Abdul Sesay – (MNE) – Mladost Podgorica (2013)–2014
 Rodney Strasser – (CRO) – Zagreb 2015–2016
 Lamin Suma – (SRB, MNE) – Jagodina 2011–2012, Jedinstvo Bijelo Polje 2012–2013
 Julius Wobay – (SVN) – Olimpija Ljubljana 2015–2017

Singapore
 Aleksandar Đurić – (SRB) – Napredak Kruševac 2000–2001
 Mirko Grabovac – (CRO) – Primorac 1929 1993–1995, Cibalia Vinkovci 1995–1996, Zadar 1996–1997

Slovakia
 Pavol Bajza – (SVN) – Zavrč (2015)–2016
 Dávid Berežný – (SVN) – Zavrč 2015–(2016)
 Janoš Buzgo – (Yug/SRB) – NAK Novi Sad 1935–1936
 Jozef Buzgo – (Yug/SRB) – NAK Novi Sad 1935–1936
 Michal Drahno – (SVN) – ND Gorica 2008–2009
 Filip Ďuriš – (SVN) – Zavrč 2015–(2016)
 Hesko – (Yug/SRB) – Vojvodina 1923–1924
 Erik Jirka – (SRB) – Red Star Belgrade 2018–2019, Radnički Niš 2019–2020
 Maroš Klimpl – (SRB) – Sloboda Užice 2010–2011
 Ján Krivák – (MKD) – Škendija Tetovo 2019–2022
 Peter Lérant – (CRO, SVN) – Rijeka 2003–2007, ND Gorica 2007–2008
 Augustín Paulík – (SVN) – Koper 2006–2007
 Milan Pavlovič – (MNE) – Jezero Plav 2008–2009
 Peter Petrán – (SVN) – Primorje 2008–2010
 Ján Podhradský – (Yug/SRB) – Vojvodina 1935–1936, BSK Belgrade 1936–1939 (both Yugoslav and Slovak international)
 Karol Praženica – (CRO) – Hajduk Split 1993–1995
 Milan Šimčák – (SVN) – Koper 2022–present
 Nikolas Špalek – (SRB) – TSC Bačka Topola (2022)–2023
 Jakub Sylvestr – (CRO) – Dinamo Zagreb 2010–2012
 Marián Tomčák – (SVN) – Rudar Velenje 2009–2011
 Matúš Vojtko – (CRO) – HNK Gorica 2022–present
 Jakub Vojtuš – (CRO) – Zagreb 2012–2013
 Lajoš Žiga – (Yug/SRB) – BASK Belgrade 1936–1937
 Milan Zvarík – (Yug/SRB) – Vojvodina 1985–1986

Solomon Islands
 Raphael Lea'i – (BIH) – Velež Mostar 2022–present

Somalia
 Abel Gigli – (SVN) – ND Gorica 2013–2014, Maribor (2015)–2016

South Africa
 Ranga Chivaviro – (KOS) – Trepça '89 2020–(2021)
 Keith Groeneveld – (KOS) – Feronikeli 2019–(2020)
 Steven Hoffman – (KOS) – Llapi (2020)–2021
 Happy Mashau – (KOS) – Trepça '89 2020–2021, 2022–present
 Thabang Molefe – (SVN) – ND Gorica 1999–2000
 Mphakamiseni Nene – (KOS) – Trepça '89 2020–(2021)
 Bernard Parker – (SRB) – Red Star Belgrade 2008–2009

South Sudan
 Kur Kur – (SRB) – Novi Pazar (2022)–2023
 Ladule Lako LoSarah – (MKD) – Bregalnica Štip 2010–2011

Spain
 Victor Aliaga – (SVN) – Triglav Kranj 2019–2020, ND Gorica (2020)–2021
 Gastón Alonso – (SVN) – Tabor Sežana (2020)–2021
 Adrià Altimira – (CRO) – Lokomotiva Zagreb (2020)–2021
 Pablo Álvarez – (CRO) – Rijeka 2022–present
 Diego Barri – (CRO) – Osijek 2021–present
 Jalen Blesa – (KOS) – Prishtina 2022–present
 Álvaro Brachi – (SVN) – Domžale 2015–2017
 Burgui – (CRO) – Šibenik 2021–present
 José Cañas – (SRB) – Red Star Belgrade 2019–2020
 José Antonio Caro – (CRO) – Osijek 2020–2022
 Coba Gomes da Costa – (SVN) – Tabor Sežana (2022)–2023
 Cristian – (SVN) – Koper (2015)–2016
 Antonio Cristian – (CRO) – Rudeš 2017–(2018)
 José Domínguez – (MKD) – Pelister Bitola (2021)–2022
 Francis Durán – (SRB) – Jagodina (2012)–2013
 Juanan Entrena – (CRO) – Rudeš 2017–(2018)
 Álex Fernández – (CRO) – Rijeka 2014–(2015)
 Adrián Fuentes  – (CRO) – Istra 1961 2018–2020
 Einar Galilea – (CRO) – Rudeš 2017–(2018), Istra 1961 2019–present
 Jorge Giménez – (MKD) – Vardar Skopje 2012–2014
 Madger Gomes – (CRO) – Istra 1961 2018–(2019)
 Sergi González – (CRO) – Istra 1961 2019–2021
 Javi Hervás – (BIH) – Željezničar Sarajevo (2016)–2017
 Dani Iglesias – (CRO) – Istra 1961 2018–2019, Rijeka 2019–2021
 Ioritz Landeta – (CRO) – Istra 1961 2018–2019
 Borja López – (CRO) – Hajduk Split 2017–2019
 Ignacio Maganto – (CRO) – Hajduk Split (2016)–2017
 Álvaro Martín – (CRO) – Šibenik 2020–2021
 Antonio Moreno – (SRB) – Partizan Belgrade (2008)–2009
 Rafa Navarro – (CRO) – Istra 1961 2020–2022
 Unai Naveira – (CRO) – Istra 1961 2022–present
 Jonathan Ñíguez – (SVN) – Koper 2015–(2016)
 Carlos Olmo – (CRO) – Lokomotiva Zagreb 2020–2021
 Dani Olmo – (CRO) – Dinamo Zagreb 2014–2020
 Rafa Páez – (CRO) – Rudeš 2017–(2018), Istra 1961 2019–2021
 Pablo Pallarés – (SVN) – ND Gorica (2020)–2021
 Ivan Peñaranda – (BIH) – Slavija Sarajevo 2004–2005
 Antonio Perera – (CRO) – Istra 1961 2020–2022
 Iker Pozo – (CRO) – Rijeka 2021–(2022), Šibenik 2022–present
 Albert Riera – (SVN) – Zavrč (2015)–2016, Koper 2015–(2016)
 Julio Rodríguez – (CRO) – Istra 1961 2018–2019
 Aitor Ruano – (SVN) – Zavrč (2015)–2016
 Iñigo Sarasola – (SVN) – Olimpija Ljubljana (2012)–2013
 Arturo Segado – (CRO) – Rudeš 2017–2018, Istra 1961 (2018)–2019
 Ramón Soria – (SVN) – Celje 2014–2016
 Francisco Tena  – (CRO) – Istra 1961 (2018)–2019
 Toñito – (CRO) – Rijeka 2006–2007
 Marc Valiente – (SRB) – Partizan Belgrade 2018–2019
 Jorge Yepes – (MNE) – Mladost Podgorica 2013–(2014)

Suriname
 Mitchell Donald – (SRB) – Red Star Belgrade 2015–2018
 Lorenzo Valaga – (MNE) – Rudar Pljevlja 2009–2010
 Natano Wattimena – (MKD) – Sileks Kratovo 2012–(2013)

Sweden
 Arben Adžović – (MNE) – Dečić Tuzi 2011–2012, 2013–2015, Mladost Podgorica 2012–2013
 Ferhad Ayaz – (BIH) – Borac Banja Luka 2021–(2022)
 Valmir Berisha – (BIH) – Velež Mostar (2019)–2020
 Bojan Djordjic – (SRB) – Red Star Belgrade 2003–2004
 Frederick Enaholo – (Yug/SRB) – Vojvodina 1991–1992
 Tony Flygare – (MKD) – Cementarnica 55 2005–2006
 Mirza Halvadžić – (BIH) – Željezničar Sarajevo 2015–(2016), Sloboda Tuzla (2020)–2021
 Alexander Kačaniklić – (CRO) – Hajduk Split 2020–2022
 Darko Lukanović – (SVN) – Koper 2016–(2017)
 Luka Mijaljević – (CRO) – Istra 1961 (2011)–2012
 Daniel Miljanović – (BIH) – Mladost Doboj Kakanj 2020–(2021)
 William Milovanovic – (SVN) – Koper 2022–present
 Marko Mitrović – (SRB) – Radnički Niš (2018)–2019, (2019)–2020, Dinamo Vranje 2018–(2019)
 Mirza Mujčić – (SVN) – Olimpija Ljubljana 2018–2019
 Aleksandar Mujkic – (MNE) – Arsenal Tivat 2022–present
 Niclas Nylen – (Yug/SRB) – Vojvodina 1984–1985
 Armin Pasagic – (BIH) – Mladost Doboj Kakanj 2015–(2016)
 Petar Petrović – (SRB) – Radnički Niš (2014)–2015, 2018–2019
 Rasim Reiz – (BIH) – Sarajevo (2007)–2008, Željezničar Sarajevo 2007–(2008)
 Egzon Sekiraça – (KOS) – Trepça '89 2017–2018
 Alberto Seli – (MNE) – Mogren Budva 1999–2000
 Andrej Simeunović – (SRB) – Voždovac 2017–(2018)
 Richard Teberio – (CRO) – Dinamo Zagreb 1997–(1998)
 Max Watson – (SVN) – Maribor 2021–present

Switzerland
 Miloš Antić – (SRB) – OFK Beograd 2014–2016
 Enes Azizi – (MKD) – Škendija Tetovo 2014–2016, Shkupi 2018–2020
 Omar Baljić – (BIH) – Željezničar Sarajevo 2010–2012
 Milan Basrak – (BIH, SRB, MKD) – Radnik Bijeljina (2014)–2015, Metalac GM (2015)–2016, Napredak Kruševac 2017–2018, Akademija Pandev 2019–2020
 Mihailo Bogićević – (SRB) – Spartak Subotica 2021–present
 Boško Borenović – (SRB) – Zemun 2006–(2007)
 Stefan Čolović – (SRB) – OFK Belgrade 2014–2016
 Nemanja Cvijanović – (SRB) – Dinamo Vranje 2018–(2019)
 Adem Demiri – (MNE) – Dečić Tuzi 2022–present
 Josip Drmić – (CRO) – Rijeka 2020–2022, Dinamo Zagreb 2022–present
 Slaviša Dugić – (BIH) – Modriča 2007–(2008), Borac Banja Luka (2012)–2013
 Allan Eleouet – (BIH) – Tuzla City 2022–present
 Elmedin Fazlić – (SVN) – Domžale 2022–present
 Shpresim Fazlija – (KOS) – Liria Prizren 2018–2019
 Filip Frei – (SRB) – Radnički Niš 2022–present
 Mario Gavranović – (CRO) – Rijeka 2015–2018, Dinamo Zagreb 2017–2021
 Karim Gazzetta – (BIH) – Zrinjski Mostar (2022)–2023
 Ensar Hajrović – (BIH) – Tuzla City 2018–(2019)
 Mirsad Hasanović – (BIH) – Tuzla City 2018–present
 Goran Ivelja – (CRO) – Cibalia Vinkovci 2003–2004
 Vasilije Janjičić – (SVN) – Celje 2021–present
 Zoran Josipovic – (CRO) – Istra 1961 2022–present
 Darije Kalezić – (Yig/BIH) – Velež Mostar 1987–1994, 2002–2003
 Robin Kamber – (CRO) – Slaven Belupo 2019–(2020)
 Stojko Kikić – (BIH) – Radnik Bijeljina 2013–2014, Borac Banja Luka (2015)–2016
 Svetlan Kosić – (SVN) – Krško 2016–(2017)
 Mihael Kovačević – (SVN, CRO) – Koper 2007–2008, Zadar 2011–2012
 Veselin Lakić – (SRB) – Rad Beograd (2016)–2017
 Boban Maksimović – (SRB) – Red Star Belgrade (2008)–2009, Vojvodina 2008–2010
 Srdjan Maksimović – (SRB) – Rad Belgrade 2005–2008
 Milan Marjanović – (SRB) – Metalac G.M. 2019–(2020)
 Ivan Martić – (CRO) – Rijeka 2016–2017
 Francesco Merola – (SVN) – Primorje 2010–2011
 Igor Mijatović – (BIH) – Drina Zvornik 2015–(2016)
 Vladan Milosevic – (BIH) – Drina Zvornik 2014–2015
 Miodrag Mitrović – (SVN) – Krka 2014–2016
 François Moubandje – (CRO) – Dinamo Zagreb 2019–2022
 Nikola Nikolić – (SRB) – BSK Borča (2009)–2010
 Nedim Omeragić – (BIH) – Tuzla City 2018–(2019)
 Alban Ramadani – (KOS) – Llapi 2020–2021
 Anis Ramčilović – (BIH) – Velež Mostar 2018–(2019), Sloboda Tuzla (2019)–2020
 Nezbedin Selimi – (SVN) – Primorje 2008–2009, Rudar Velenje 2009–2010
 Gëzim Shalaj – (KOS) – Trepça '89 2017–2019
 Velibor Simić – (BIH) – Drina Zvornik 2015–(2016)
 Edis Smajovic – (MKD) – Pelister Bitola 2020–(2021), Borec Veles (2021)–2022
 Luka Stević – (SRB) – Metalac G.M. (2021)–2022
 Dejan Subotić – (SRB) – Rad Belgrade 2018–2019
 Nikola Sukacev – (SRB) – Metalac G.M. 2020–2021
 Mato Šego – (BIH) – Široki Brijeg 2007–2008
 Stefan Todorović – (SRB) – Javor Ivanjica 2010–2011
 Josip Uzelac – (CRO) – Istra 1961 (2013)–2014, RNK Split (2014)–2015
 Alex Veljanovski – (MKD) – Napredok Kičevo 2003–2004
 Nikita Vlasenko – (CRO) – Rijeka (2022)–2023

Syria
 Ahmad Kallasi – (BIH) – Sarajevo 2014–2016

Tajikistan
 Nuriddin Davronov – (SRB) – Sloboda Užice 2012–2013

Tanzania
 Morice Abraham – (SRB) – Spartak Subotica 2021–present
 Alphonce Msanga – (SRB) – Spartak Subotica 2021–present
 Thomas Ulimwengu – (BIH) – Sloboda Tuzla 2017–(2018)

Togo
 Charles Acolatse – (MKD) – Sileks Kratovo 2018–2019
 Serge Akakpo – (SVN) – Celje 2010–2012
 Eric Akoto – (SVN) – Interblock 2007–2008
 Asmiou Ayewa – (SVN) – Interblock 2009–(2010)
 Malcolm Barcola – (BIH) – Tuzla City 2022–present
 Emmanuel Hackman – (SRB) – Mladost GAT 2022–present
 Dosseh Koffi – (MKD) – Skopje (2017)–2018
 Elom Nya-Vedji – (MNE) – Rudar Pljevlja 2018–(2019), Zeta 2019–2021
 Samsondin Ouro – (SVN) – Mura 2020–2022, Radomlje 2022–present
 Didier Paass – (BIH) – Posušje 2007–2008
 Massamesso Tchangai – (SVN) – ND Gorica 1998–1999

Trinidad and Tobago
 Trevin Caesar – (KOS) – Gjilani 2018–2019
 Silvio Spann – (CRO) – Dinamo Zagreb 2003–2005

Tunisia
 Ahmed Guilouzi – (CRO) – Zagreb 2011–2013
 Iheb Hadj Khalifa – (CRO) – Lokomotiva Zagreb 2019–2020
 Ahmed Raddaoui – (KOS) – Prishtina (2020)–2021
 Wajdi Sahli – (MNE) – Sutjeska Nikšić 2022–present
 Nabil Taïder – (SVN) – ND Gorica (2013)–2014, 2014–2015
 Kamel Zaiem – (SRB) – Partizan Belgrade (2008)–2009

Turkey
 Hakan Akgül – (MKD) – Akademija Pandev 2022–present
 Enes Akgün – (MKD, BIH) – Shkupi 2015–2016, Čelik Zenica 2017–2018
 Selim Aydemir – (BIH) – Čelik Zenica 2018–2019
 Cem Barlik – (KOS) – Feronikeli 2019–(2020)
 Emre Can Atila – (MKD) – Shkupi 2017–2018
 Oguzhan Demirci – (SVN) – Tabor Sežana (2022)–2023
 Volkan Egri – (BIH) – Čelik Zenica 2019–2020
 Abdullah Emre – (MKD) – Metalurg Skopje 2015–2016
 Salim Farsak – (MKD) – Shkupi (2020)–2021 
 Firat Güllü – (BIH, MKD) – Čelik Zenica 2019–(2020), Shkupi (2020)–2021 
 Yunus Gülnar – (BIH) – Čelik Zenica 2014–2015
 Savaş Gündüz – (SVN) – Bela Krajina 2006–2007
 Berke Gürbüz – (BIH) – Sloboda Tuzla 2021–(2022)
 Emir Han Topçu – (BIH) – Čelik Zenica 2019–2020
 Ismail Iber – (Yug/MKD) – Rapid Skoplje 1924–1925
 Şiyar Kepir  – (SVN) – Aluminij 2017–(2018)
 Ömer Koça – (SRB) – Čukarički Belgrade 2000–2002
 Umut Nayir – (CRO) – Hajduk Split 2020–2021
 Javid Nuri – (Yug/MKD) – Građanski Skoplje 1923–1924
 Günkut Özer – (SRB) – Radnički Niš (2015)–2016
 Deniz Ömer Sarı – (BIH) – Laktaši 2009–(2010)
 Anıt Şengüler – (KOS, MKD) – Drita Gjilan 2011–2014, Makedonija GP 2013–(2014)
 Erkan Tuzinoğlu – (BIH) – Rudar Breza 1997–1998
 Berat Ustabasi – (MKD) – Shkupi 2018–2019
 Burak Yamaç – (BIH) – Mladost Doboj Kakanj 2018–2020
 Soner Yıldırım – (KOS) – Liria Prizren 2008–2009
 Okan Yıldız – (MKD) – Mladost Carev Dvor (2015)–2016
 Canberk Yurdakul – (MKD) – Shkupi 2019–(2020)

Uganda
 Khalid Aucho – (SRB) – Red Star Belgrade 2016–(2017)
 Nestroy Kizito – (SRB) – Vojvodina 2005–2010, Partizan Belgrade 2010–2011
 Halid Lwaliwa – (MKD) – Bregalnica Štip 2022–present
 Farouk Miya – (CRO) – HNK Gorica 2018–2019
 Eugene Sseppuya – (SRB, MNE) – Vojvodina 2007–2008, Čukarički Belgrade 2008–2009, Mladi Radnik (2009)–2010, Borac Čačak 2011–2012, Jedinstvo Bijelo Polje 2012–2013

Ukraine
 Maksym Andrushchenko – (SRB) – Spartak Subotica (2020)–2021
 Izzet Bilyalov – (MNE) – Zeta (2015)–2016
 Maksym Bilyi – (CRO) – Hajduk Split 2015–2016
 Andriy Bobrov – (KOS) – Trepça 2014–2015
 Taras Bondarenko – (SRB) – Metalac G.M. 2016–2017, Radnički Niš 2018–2020, Radnik Surdulica 2022–present
 Pavlo Bovtunenko – (SRB) – Novi Pazar 2013–(2014)
 Yevhen Cheberko – (CRO) – Osijek 2020–present
 Marko Devich – (SRB) – Zvezdara Belgrade 2000–2002, Železnik Belgrade 2002–2003, Voždovac 2019–2020
 Viktor Dvirnyk – (CRO) – Mladost 1927 1997–1999, NK Istra 1999–2000
 Davyd Fesyuk – (CRO) – Hajduk Split 2022–present
 Vladislav Franko – (SVN) – Beltinci 1996–1998
 Andriy Hryshchenko – (CRO) – Hrvatski Dragovoljac 1999–2000
 Vitaliy Ivanko – (MNE) – Sutjeska Nikšić (2017)–2018
 Vladyslav Khomutov – (KOS) – Dukagjini 2022–present
 Anatoliy Korniychuk – (MNE) – OFK Petrovac 2016–2017
 Ihor Koshman – (SVN) – Celje 2016–2017
 Yevhen Kovalenko – (SRB, MNE) – Rad Belgrade (2019)–2020, OFK Grbalj 2019–present
 Serhiy Kulynych – (SRB) – Spartak Subotica 2018–2019
 Dmytro Lyopa – (CRO) – Osijek 2016–2021
 Illya Markovskyy – (SVN) – Rudar Velenje 2015–2018
 Ivan Matyazh – (CRO) – Istra 1961 (2017)–2018
 Artem Milevskyi – (CRO) – Hajduk Split 2014–2015, RNK Split (2015)–2016
 Petro Namuilyk – (SVN) – Zavrč 2015–(2016)
 Yevhen Novak – (MKD) – Vardar Skopje 2015–2020
 Borys Orlovskyi – (KOS) – Trepça '89 2017–(2018)
 Yevhen Pavlov – (SRB) – Mladost Lučani 2014–2015, Radnik Surdulica 2019–2021, Radnički Niš 2021–2022
 Oleksandr Petrusenko – (CRO) – Istra 1961 2022–present
 Roman Plyushch – (CRO) – HNK Gorica 2022–present
 Artem Radchenko – (CRO) – Hajduk Split 2015–2016
 Eduard Serbul – (MNE) – OFK Grbalj (2019)–2020
 Stanislav Shtanenko – (SVN) – Zavrč 2015–(2016)
 Ihor Sheptytskyi – (SVN) – Svoboda 1993–1994
 Oleksiy Shram – (MNE) – Bokelj Kotor 2007–2008
 Ivan Spotar – (Yug/SRB) – OFK Belgrade 1957–1958
 Yuri Stefanishin – (MKD) – Pobeda Prilep 2002–2003
 Mykhailo Stelmakh – (Yug/SRB) – Spartak Subotica 1991–1992
 Stepanin Stepanuchkin – (MKD) – Pobeda Prilep 2002–2003
 Oleksandr Svatok – (CRO) – Hajduk Split 2018–2020
 Artur Teodorovich – (MKD) – Vardar Skopje 1996–1997
 Yevgeniy Terzi – (MNE) – Podgorica 2021–(2022)
 Vitaliy Tolmachyov – (SRB) – Spartak Subotica 1993–1994
 Oleksandr Tomakh – (CRO) – Istra 1961 2013–(2014)
 Mykyta Turbayevskyi – (CRO) – Lokomotiva Zagreb 2021–(2022)
 Yuriy Vakulko – (SRB) – Partizan Belgrade 2017–2018
 Oleksandr Yarovenko – (MNE) – Kom Podgorica (2019)–2020
 Artur Zahorulko – (MNE) – Zeta 2021–(2022)
 Vadym Zhuk – (SRB) – Spartak Subotica (2016)–2017

United States
 Freddy Adu – (SRB) – Jagodina (2014)–2015
 Samuel Allen – (MNE) – Dečić Tuzi 2007–2008
 Agustin Anello – (CRO) – Hajduk Split 2022–present
 Danny Barrera – (SRB) – Spartak Subotica (2011)–2012
 Travis Bowen – (MKD) – Akademija Pandev (2017)–2018, Pelister Bitola 2017–(2018)
 Mark Conrad – (SRB, BIH) – Vojvodina (2007)–2008, Velež Mostar 2007–(2008)
 Lindon Dedvukaj – (MKD) – Gostivar 2013–2014
 Matt Dunn – (SRB) – OFK Belgrade 2011–2013
 Romain Gall – (SRB) – Mladost GAT 2022–present
 Gino Gardassanich – (Yug/CRO) – Građanski Zagreb 1940–1941, Kvarner Rijeka 1946–1947
 Ilirian Gjata – (KOS) – Llapi 2017–2018
 Christopher Greer – (CRO) – Cibalia Vinkovci 2003–2004
 Jordan Gruber – (SRB) – OFK Belgrade 2005–2006
 Tom Heinemann – (KOS) – Prishtina 2009–(2010)
 Macario Hing-Glover – (CRO, SVN) – Istra 1961 (2017)–2018, Krško 2017–2018
 Momodou Jallow – (BIH) – Borac Banja Luka 2019–2021
 Will John – (SRB) – Čukarički Belgrade 2008–2009
 Steven Juncaj – (SVN) – ND Gorica 2022–present
 Amet Korça – (CRO) – HNK Gorica (2022)–2023
 Erik Kuster – (CRO) – Čakovec 2000–2001
 Eric Lukin – (CRO) – Pomorac Kostrena 2001–(2002)
 Jovan Milojevich – (MNE) – Budućnost Podgorica 1995–1996
 Ilija Mitic – (Yug/SRB) – Partizan Belgrade 1960–1965, OFK Belgrade 1965–1967
 Simon Mrsic – (BIH, SRB) – Rudar Prijedor 2015–2016, Bačka Bačka Palanka 2016–2018
 Kyrian Nwabueze – (SVN, MKD, KOS) – ND Gorica 2017–2018, Pobeda Prilep (2018)–2019, Drita Gjilan 2018–(2019)
 Raul Palomares – (CRO, BIH) – Osijek 2001–2002, Žepče 2002–2004, Zadar 2004–2005
 Alonzo Peart – (MNE) – Iskra Danilovgrad (2022)–2023
 Preki – (Yug/SRB) – Red Star Belgrade 1983–1985
 Rokas Pukštas – (CRO) – Hajduk Split 2021–present
 Danilo Radjen – (SRB, MKD) – Bačka Bačka Palanka 2020–2021, Borec Veles 2021–2022, Iskra Danilovgrad 2022–present
 Cesar Romero – (MKD) – Vardar Skopje (2015)–2016
 Johann Smith – (CRO) – Rijeka (2009)–2010
 Scoop Stanisic – (Yug/SRB) – Partizan Belgrade 1983–1984
 Christopher Sulincevski – (Yug/MKD) – Vardar Skopje 1988–1989
 Aleksandar Thomas Višić – (SRB) – Rad Belgrade 2011–2012
 Jeremiah White – (SRB) – OFK Belgrade 2003–2004
 Sachem Wilson – (SVN) – ND Gorica 2016–2017

Uruguay
 Giorginho Aguirre – (KOS) – Liria Prizren (2015)–2016
 Sasha Aneff – (SVN, CRO) – Domžale 2013–2015, Osijek 2014–(2015)
 Pablo Ceppelini – (SVN) – Maribor 2013–2014
 Miguel Angel Lavié – (SRB) – Javor Ivanjica 2009–2010
 Pio Martins – (KOS) – Liria Prizren 2018–(2019)
 Gonzalo Mastriani – (SVN) – ND Gorica 2013–2014
 Pablo Munhoz – (CRO) – Hajduk Split 2004–2007
 Federico Platero – (CRO) – Osijek 2014–(2015)
 Gerardo Vonder Pütten – (SRB) – Javor Ivanjica (2009)–2010

Uzbekistan
 Temurkhuja Abdukholiqov – (CRO) – Hajduk Split 2013–2015
 Husniddin Gafurov – (SRB) – Javor Ivanjica 2013–2017, Mladost Lučani (2017)–2018
 Pavel Georgijevski – (Yug/MKD) – Vardar Skopje 1975–1984
 Murod Rajabov – (SRB) – Novi Pazar (2016)–2017

Venezuela
 Manuel Arteaga – (CRO) – Hajduk Split 2015–2016
 Andris Herrera – (CRO) – Varaždin 2020–2021, 2022–present
 Darwin Matheus – (CRO) – Istra 1961 2022–present
 Luis Jimènez Vivas – (KOS) – Liria Prizren 2018–2019
 Gustavo Páez – (SVN) – Interblock 2009–2010
 Octavio Páez – (CRO) – Istra 1961 2018–2020
 Guillermo Ramírez – (KOS) – Liria Prizren 2018–2019
 Santiago Rodriguez – (MKD) – Rabotnički Skopje 2021–(2022)
 Aristóteles Romero – (SVN) – Ankaran Hrvatini 2017–2018
 Jeffrén Suárez – (CRO) – Slaven Belupo 2019–2021

Wales
 Robbie Burton – (CRO) – Dinamo Zagreb 2019–2022, Istra 1961 (2021)–2022
 Cole Dasilva – (CRO) – Šibenik (2021)–2022
 Dylan Levitt – (CRO) – Istra 1961 2020–(2021)

Zambia
 Emmanuel Banda – (CRO) – Rijeka 2022–present
 Kevin Kalila – (BIH) – Široki Brijeg 2004–2005
 Kings Kangwa – (SRB) – Red Star Belgrade 2022–present
 Albert Kangwanda – (CRO) – HNK Gorica (2022)–2023
 Prince Mumba – (CRO) – Istra 1961 (2022)–2023

Zimbabwe
 Blessing Makunike – (SRB) – Javor Ivanjica 2002–2003
 Mike Temwanjera – (SRB) – Javor Ivanjica 2002–2006, Borac Čačak 2006–2007
 Leonard Tsipa – (SRB) – Javor Ivanjica 2002–2003

Notes and references

Related pages
 List of foreign football players in Serbia

External sources
The entire list was created using, besides directories and monografies, the following sources:
 Ex-Yu Fudbal – Yugoslav League and Cup statistics
 RSSSF – RSSSF, historical football data
 Soccerway – Generalistic football website
 Playerhistory.com
 National–football–teams.com – Worldwide national teams and player careers and statistics
 EU Football.info – European national teams and players data
 Utakmica.rs – Serbian SuperLiga data
 Srbijafudbal – Serbian first, second and third league squads
 HRnogomet.com – Croatian First League database
 Prvaliga.si – Slovenian First League website
 MacedonianFootball.com – News and stats from Macedonian national team, and first and second leagues
 FSCG.me – Montenegrin FA official website
 SportSport.bs – News and data about Bosnian football
 AlbaniaSoccer.com – Albanian and Kosovar league data and squads
 Worldfootball – Generalistic football data
 FootballSquads.co.uk – Squads of numerous top-tiers
 Eufo – European top-league squads
 Zerozero – Generalistic football data
 FootballDatabase.eu – Generalistic football website
 FussballDaten.de – Data about German leagues players
 Austriasoccer.at – Austrian football data
 MagyarFutball.hu – Data about Hungarian football
 Enciclopedia del calcio – Data of Italian leagues players
 FootballFacts.ru – Data of leagues and career profiles from CIS
 Klisf.info – Russian and former-USSR player careers
 Romaniansoccer.ro – Data about Romanian league players
 Mackolik.com – Data about Turkish league players
 90minut.pl – Data about Polish league players
 ForadeJogo.net – Data about players from Portuguese leagues
 BDFA – South-American football data
 OzFootball.net – Data about Australian leagues players
 Nogometni leksikon – Croatian football encyclopedia
 Igor Kramarsic – History and diverse data about Croatian football
 GhanaWeb – Data about Ghanaian players
 WestAfricanFootball.com – News and data about West African football
 YU Fudbal – Squads of FR Yugoslavia leagues
 Candoris – Pre-WWII European clubs
 Macedonian Soccer Server – Macedonian League data
 Die legionäre – Book about Austrian players and coaches abroad

expatriate
Yugoslavia
Association football player non-biographical articles